= 1929 Bahamas hurricane =

Category 4 Atlantic hurricane in 1929

Hurricane Two 1929 Bahamas hurricane Great Andros Island hurricane
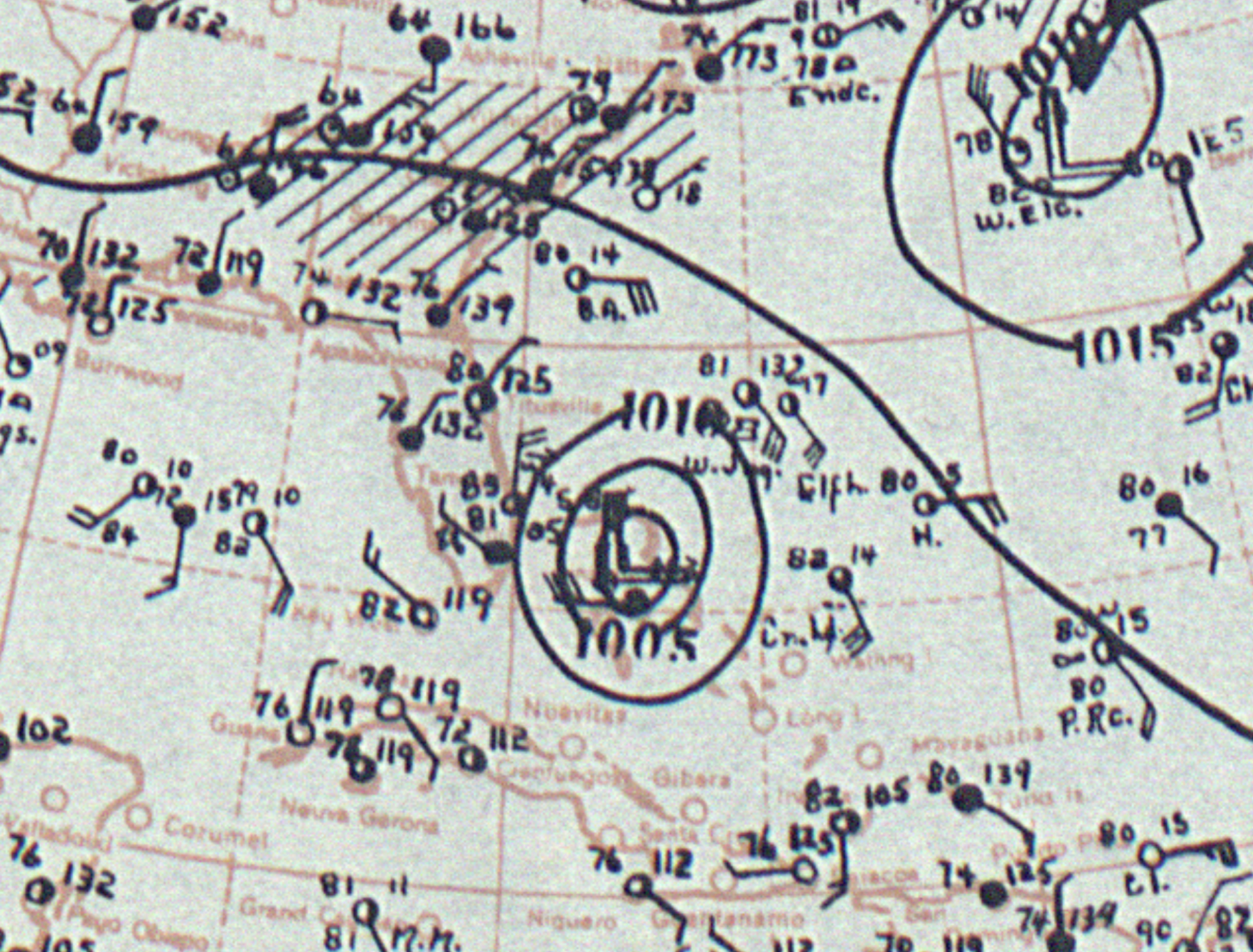
- Surface weather map of the hurricane at peak intensity over the Bahamas on September 25

Meteorological history
- Formed: September 22, 1929
- Dissipated: October 4, 1929

Category 4 major hurricane
- 1-minute sustained (SSHWS/NWS)
- Highest winds: 155 mph (250 km/h)
- Lowest pressure: 924 mbar (hPa); 27.29 inHg

Overall effects
- Fatalities: 155 direct
- Damage: $9.31 million (1929 USD) (U.S. damage only)
- Areas affected: British Bahamas; Florida; East Coast of the United States; The Maritimes
- IBTrACS
- Part of the 1929 Atlantic hurricane season

The 1929 Bahamas hurricane (also known as the Great Andros Island Hurricane) was a high-end Category 4 tropical cyclone whose intensity and slow forward speed led to catastrophic damage in the Bahamas in September 1929, particularly on Andros and New Providence islands. Its erratic path and a lack of nearby weather observations made the hurricane difficult to locate and forecast. The storm later made two landfalls in Florida, killing eleven but causing comparatively light damage. Moisture from the storm led to extensive flooding over the Southeastern United States, particularly along the Savannah River. Across its path from the Bahamas to the mouth of the Saint Lawrence River, the hurricane killed 155 people.

The storm's origins can be traced to tropical wave first noted near the Cabo Verde Islands on September 11, 1929. This tropical disturbance remained dormant as it tracked west until September 18, when an associated area of thunderstorms developed into a tropical depression northeast of Puerto Rico. Gradually strengthening, the depression reached tropical storm strength on September 22 and hurricane strength on September 23. Beginning on September 24, the storm took a slow and southwestward path through the Bahamas, passing over Nassau and Andros Island between September 25–26 with maximum sustained winds of 145 mph (230 km/h). (Note: HURDAT, the official database for the intensities and tracks of Atlantic tropical cyclones maintained by the National Hurricane Center, lists the maximum sustained winds of storms to the nearest five knots. Conversions to miles per hour (mph) and kilometers per hours (km/h) based on this database are derived from the original value in knots and rounded to the nearest five.) This southwestward trajectory was unprecedented for the islands. The storm then curved west and struck the Florida Keys at Key Largo on September 28 with winds of 115 mph (185 km/h). Two days later, the cyclone moved ashore Apalachicola, Florida, as a minimal hurricane shortly before transitioning into an extratropical cyclone. This system tracked northeast along the interior of the East Coast of the United States before dissipating near the Saint Lawrence River on October 4.

Poorly-built structures and ships were destroyed throughout the Bahamas. Andros Island was within the envelope of the storm's hurricane-force winds and storm surge for two days. Parts of the island were inundated by a 12 ft (3.7 m) surge that advanced 20 mi (32 km) inland, wiping out all crops and most fruit trees and livestock. A wind gust of 164 mph (264 km/h) was measured in Nassau, which also experienced the calm of the hurricane's eye for two hours. An estimated 73% of the city's homes and businesses sustained damage, leaving more than 5,000 people without homes. The hurricane was a heavy blow to the declining sponge industry on the islands. Following the storm, wild birds and crops were brought from the Caribbean to replenish their losses in the Bahamas. New building codes were enacted after the 1929 storm to prevent similarly extensive destruction.

A 6–9 ft (1.8–2.7 m) storm surge battered the Florida Keys, washing out highways and sinking small fishing boats. At least five tornadoes struck Florida, representing some of the first verified reports of tornadoes caused by a tropical cyclone. One impacted Fort Lauderdale's business center and caused $100,000 in damage. (Note: All monetary values are in 1929 United States dollars unless otherwise indicated.) The Apalachicola waterfront sustained heavy damage from the storm's final landfall, including the loss of nearly all wharves. Widespread flooding occurred throughout Georgia and The Carolinas due to the continuous influx of moisture from the slowly-moving hurricane. A maximum rainfall total of 20.0 in (510 mm) was registered in Glennville, Georgia. The Savannah River reached a record stage of 46.1 ft (14.1 m) at Augusta, Georgia, breaching a levee and inundating much of the surrounding floodplain. The damage toll in the United States totaled to at least $9.31 million.

== Background ==
The Lucayan Archipelago is especially vulnerable to tropical cyclones due to its position within the storm tracks of Atlantic hurricanes. Approximately 80% of its landmass has an elevation within 5 ft (1.5 m) of mean sea level. Before 1929, the islands were hit by hurricanes in 1866, 1899, and 1926 that each killed over a hundred people. The Bahamas, at the time a Crown colony, was adversely affected by the Great Depression. The economic downturn was further compounded by a sharp reduction in demand in the colony's sisal and sponge after World War I, a weak Pound sterling relative to the American dollar, and a severe drought in the central and southern islands. Hurricane warning systems in the Bahamas were mostly non-existent in 1929; islanders relied on personal weather instruments or the behavior of clouds, tides, and fauna to assess risk. District officers were responsible for informing others of a storm's approach based on the barometer housed in their homes. Flags signaling a hurricane's approach were present at Bahamian forts but were raised arbitrarily and inconsistently.

== Meteorological history ==
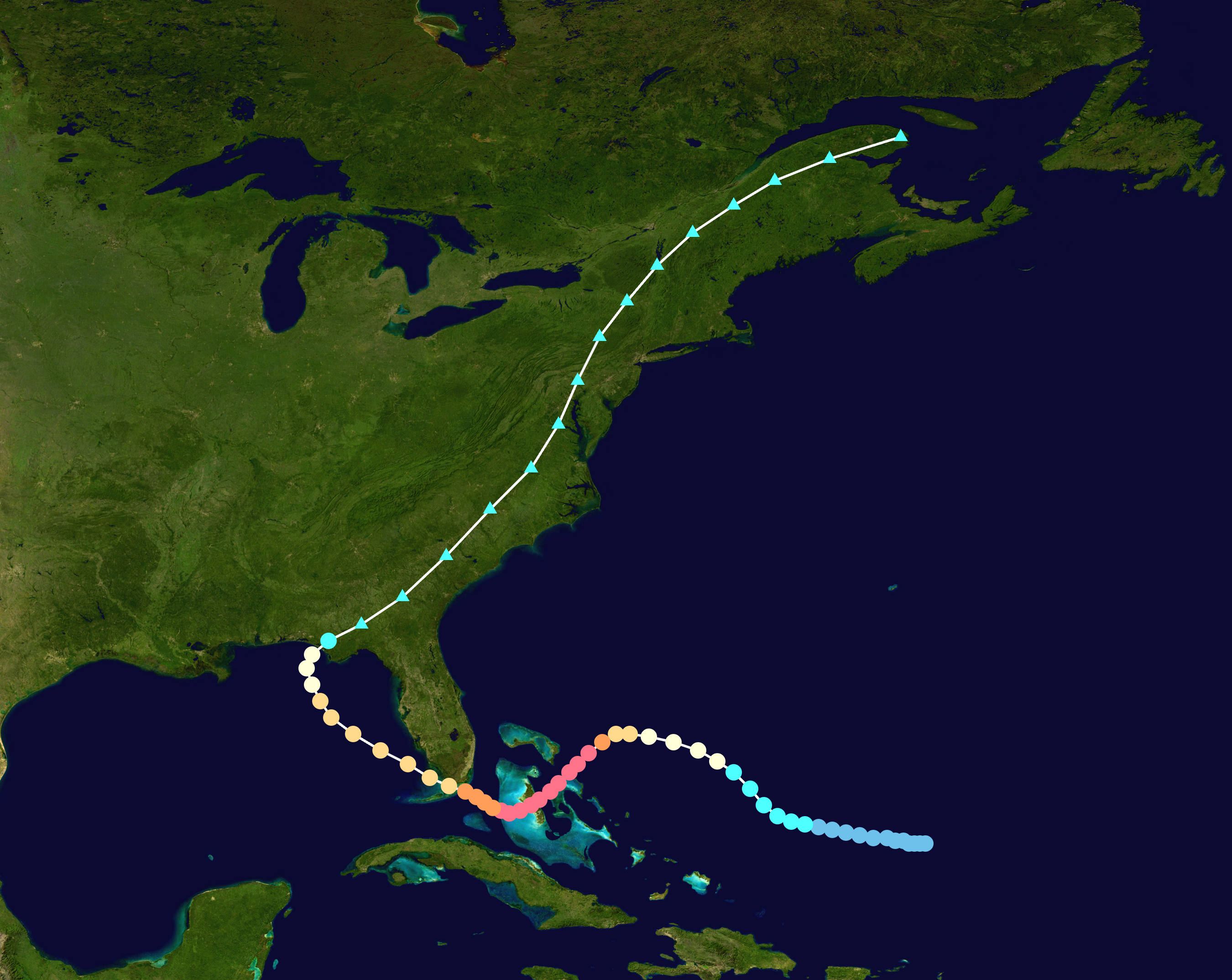
Map plotting the storm's track and intensity, according to the Saffir–Simpson scale Map key Saffir–Simpson scale Tropical depression (≤38 mph, ≤62 km/h) Tropical storm (39–73 mph, 63–118 km/h) Category 1 (74–95 mph, 119–153 km/h) Category 2 (96–110 mph, 154–177 km/h) Category 3 (111–129 mph, 178–208 km/h) Category 4 (130–156 mph, 209–251 km/h) Category 5 (≥157 mph, ≥252 km/h) Unknown Storm type Tropical cyclone Subtropical cyclone Extratropical cyclone, remnant low, tropical disturbance, or monsoon depression

The hurricane can be traced back to a complex of disturbed weather near Cabo Verde on September 11, producing showers across the open waters of the Atlantic and directed westward by the Azores High. The disturbance remained a weak tropical wave for much of its early history, but over time gradually organized. By September 15, weather maps began to notate the system as a trough of low pressure north of the Lesser Antilles. A portion of this trough split off and moved northwest towards the South Atlantic states while the remaining disturbance continued to organize, becoming a tropical depression approximately 355 mi (570 km) northeast of San Juan, Puerto Rico, by September 18. Over the next three days, the system remained a tropical depression as it tracked slowly west. It reached tropical storm strength by September 22 while 400 mi (640 km) northwest of San Juan and curved northwest. Continuing to strengthen, the storm reached hurricane intensity the following day. On September 24, the hurricane began to slowly move southwest towards the Bahamas, traversing the Northeast Providence Channel. Until that point, few observations probed the core of the hurricane on its approach of the islands due to its small size. In 2010, the Atlantic hurricane reanalysis project determined the storm had been rapidly intensifying during this period. On September 25, the steamship Potomac measured a central air pressure of 924 mbar (hPa; 27.30 inHg), suggesting wind speeds of 155 mph (250 km/h): a high-end Category 4 hurricane on the Saffir–Simpson scale.

At 00:30 UTC on September 25, the intense hurricane passed over Nassau with sustained winds of 145 mph (230 km/h); the capital city was within the calm of the eye for two hours. The next day, the storm crossed Andros Island south of Fresh Creek, moving at 2–3 mph (3.2–4.8 km/h), and afterwards curved slowly towards the west-northwest over the Florida Straits towards Florida. A high-pressure area associated with cool temperatures over the United States had been responsible for the sudden southwest trajectory over the Bahamas. The United States Weather Bureau remarked that the storm's track was "one of the most erratic and abnormal during the last 50 years", with both the slow movement and inadequate observations contributing in the agency's difficulty in locating the center of the storm. The hurricane's winds lessened while its size grew on its Florida approach, and on the morning of September 28, it crossed the Florida Keys near Tavernier, at the southern tip of Key Largo, with winds of 115 mph (185 km/h). A pressure of 948 mbar (hPa; 27.99 inHg) was estimated within a 10-minute lull near the eye's edge at Key Largo. Further weakening occurred as the hurricane accelerated northwestward into the eastern Gulf of Mexico, continuing this heading for two days. On September 30, the storm made an unexpectedly sharp turn towards the northeast, making landfall near Panama City, Florida, near midnight as a low-end hurricane with winds of 80 mph (130 km/h). Positioned near a steep temperature gradient, the storm quickly transitioned into an extratropical cyclone on October 1 shortly after landfall with cold air wrapping around the circulation. The extratropical cyclone quickly moved northeast across the Eastern Seaboard, eventually dissipating near the Saint Lawrence River by October 5.

== Effects in the Bahamas ==
Effects of the 1929 Bahamas hurricane
Country	Total Deaths	Total Damage	State	State Deaths	State Damage
The Bahamas	142	Unknown			
USA	13	$9.31 million	Alabama	0	$1,800
USA	13	$9.31 million	Florida	11	$676,000
USA	13	$9.31 million	Georgia	2	$4 million
USA	13	$9.31 million	North Carolina	0	$800,000
USA	13	$9.31 million	South Carolina	0	$3.83 million
Totals	155	$9.31 million			
Because of differing sources, totals may not match.

The 1929 hurricane brought catastrophic damage to parts of the Bahamas, killing 142 people. There, the storm has several monikers, including the "Storm of 1929" and the "Three-day Storm", among others. The storm's effects were exacerbated by the hurricane's slow motion, producing hurricane conditions for three days. Whereas the worst impacts of storms in the Bahamas were typically along coasts, the slow movement of the 1929 storm resulted in uniform destruction on both insular coasts and interiors. It was the first known instance of a storm approaching the islands from the northeast and the fifth hurricane overall to strike the island in three years. The unusual path placed Andros and New Providence islands within the strongest quadrant of the storm; the hurricane passed over these islands with an intensity equivalent to a Category 4 hurricane on the modern Saffir–Simpson scale. The swath of winds exceeding 100 mph (160 km/h) cut through much of the Bahamas, encompassing the entirety of Andros and New Providence islands and parts of Great Abaco Island and the Berry Islands.

The weaker construction standards of the era succumbed to the force of the hurricane. Poorly-built structures were destroyed en masse by the storm. Many ships throughout the Bahamas were driven ashore and destroyed. The sponging industry, at the time the colony's most prominent economic activity, was badly affected; nearly all sponge warehouses and roughly 70% of sponge vessels were destroyed, with many other ships sustaining serious damage. Communication was lost between many of the islands in the Bahamas. Only a few radio stations remained in the Out Islands, with limited capacity for international communications. Crops sustained widespread losses and roads required significant repairs.

Andros and New Providence experienced the heaviest blow in the Bahamas. Other islands in the Bahamas sustained lesser impacts as the force of winds was diminished farther out from the center of the storm. Great Abaco Island endured hurricane-force winds of up to 100 mph (160 km/h) for 36 hours, causing "minor to major damage". Nineteen homes and twelve boats were wrecked on the island. The steamship Wisconsin Bridge went aground along the southeastern tip of Abaco Island near the Hole-in-the-Wall lighthouse; all but one of the 34 crew chose not to evacuate, and those that did perished. The lighthouse was also damaged by the storm. The British freighter Domira went aground 100 ft (30 m) off Great Abaco on September 25. A colonial lighthouse tender was designated to render assistance but could not depart promptly due to the rough seas. Minor damage was also reported on Eleuthera and Cat Island. Communications on Eleuthera were disrupted after winds reached 50 mph (80 km/h). Strong but mostly non-damaging gale-force winds and squalls were reported in Grand Bahama, Great Exuma Island, Long Island, and Ragged Island; one schoolhouse collapsed in Ragged Island.

=== Andros Island ===
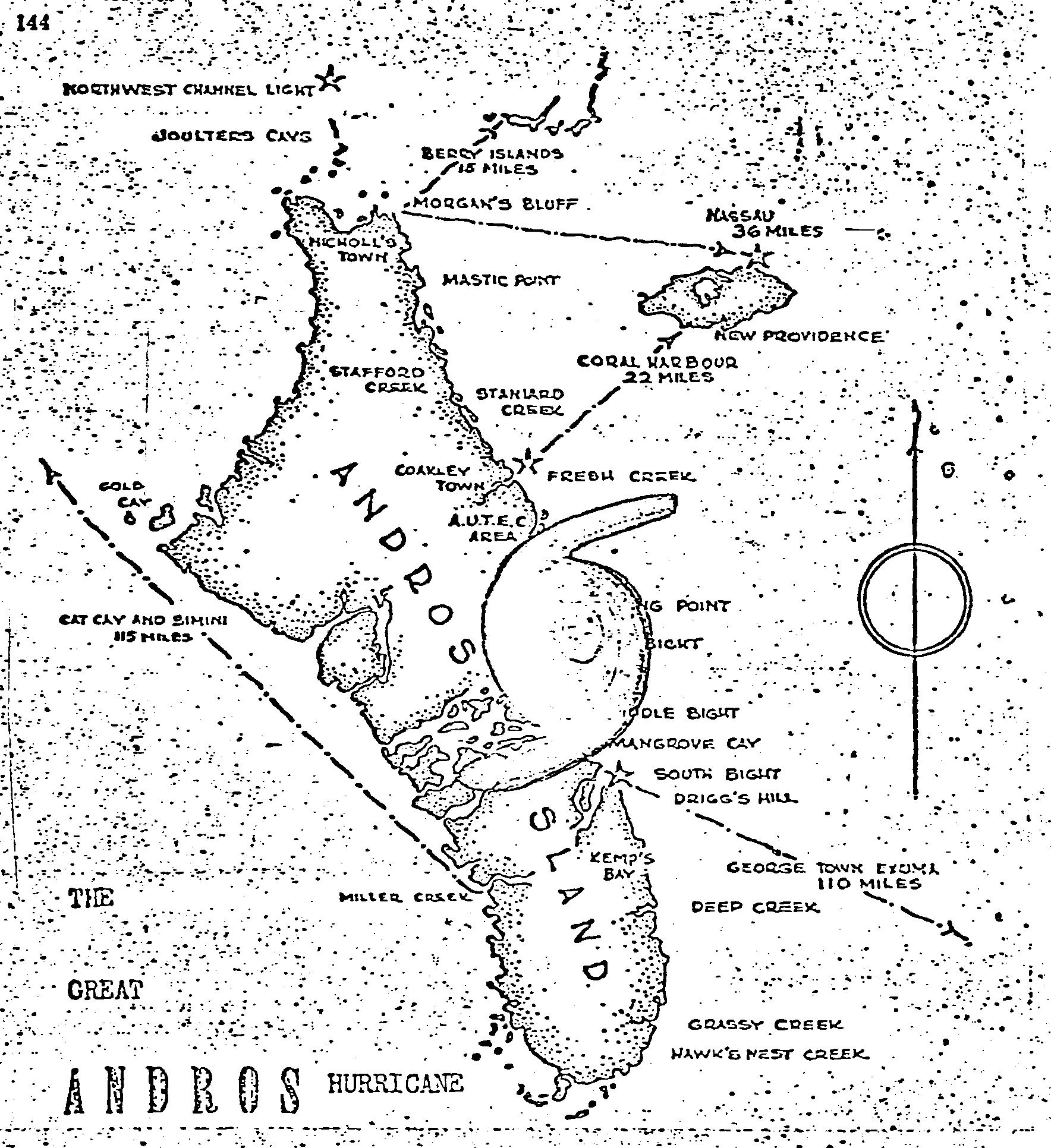
Map of Andros and New Providence islands showing the position of the storm's center as it crossed Andros Island

Andros Island experienced its worst storm in at least a century, with the entire island thoroughly devastated. At least 25 fatalities occurred on the island. As the storm's center progressed from the Tongue of the Ocean towards the west of the Bahamas, Andros Island endured hurricane-force winds and rough seas for nearly 48 hours. The onslaught was prolonged by the storm's slow motion—2–3 mph (3.2–4.8 km/h) when it moved across Andros Island on September 26—and its expansion as it approached the island; the diameter of the region of hurricane-force winds expanded from 50 mi (80 km) upon the storm's initial entrance into the Northeast Providence Channel to 100 mi (160 km) atop Andros Island. A storm surge higher than 12 ft (3.7 m) swamped the island from Mangrove Cay southward, the winds driving the sea 20 mi (32 km) inland along the western and southern coasts of Andros Island and raking the land clear of vegetation. According to the annual report for the island submitted to the Bahamas House of Assembly, all crops and most fruit trees, livestock, and poultry on Andros Island perished. In some locations, the inundation was 20 ft (6.1 m) deep. Areas of the island farther north experienced less flooding. Several ships were lost in the storm at Andros Island. The British tanker Potomac, sailing from Havana, Cuba, encountered the core of the hurricane and broke into two on Andros Island after documenting the lowest pressure associated with the hurricane. Having transported a cargo of oil, the mangled vessel was at risk of an explosion; the captain of the ship took to the boiler room to shut off valves himself. Three ships bound for Andros Island were caught in the storm. Among them was the 43 ft (13 m) schooner Pretoria, which sank at the entrance to the Fresh Creek Harbor Channel, killing 35 people with only 3 surviving. The schooner Repeat sank near Grassy Creek with the loss of most lives. At Water Cay, at least sixteen ships lost their entire yields of sponges. Many other boats were destroyed or seriously damaged. Six large sloops and another large vessel undergoing repairs were destroyed at Mangrove Cay. Many other vessels were damaged. The wind and waves vacated the seas of any ships, depositing them inland several hundred feet from their anchorage. Ten people drowned at Mangrove Cay. Another 18 drowned en route to the district after their ship sank.

Many communities on Andros Island lost homes and were littered by debris from destroyed buildings and storm-tossed boats. All churches on Andros Island were destroyed. Fresh Creek and Staniard Creek saw extensive damage from the hurricane. Six homes were razed and ten were badly damaged in Fresh Creek. Two jail cells were unroofed and the commissioner's office, residency, and outbuildings were damaged. The local telegraph station was knocked out of commission and the seawall was damaged. More than 20 people drowned following the sinking of four boats near the Andros Lighthouse at Fresh Creek. Twelve houses were destroyed in Staniard Creek; every remaining home was damaged. The local wharf and a recently completed bridge were washed away. People in the district were urged to seek shelter as water began to overtake the district. Seventy sought refuge at a Wesleyan mission house only for the building to be inundated by water, forcing the evacuees to relocate to the local schoolhouse. The house eventually held over 100 people; another 50 took shelter at a second school. A church collapsed during the storm with over a hundred inside, injuring one. Cargill Creek was abandoned after being entirely flooded, with only hills rising above the water. All homes were damaged in Blanket Sound, and 13 among them collapsed. Wrecked boats littered the area between Blanket Sound and Stafford Creek. All ships at Love Hill and Small Hope were damaged. Five homes were destroyed. Along Calabash Bay, seven houses were flattened. At the graveyard, 22 coffins were exhumed by the rough sea. Fifteen people went missing from Behring Point, where 12 homes were destroyed. Three homes remained in Rolle Town, with the rest destroyed. The wharf on Deep Creek was destroyed and its ships scattered. One ship was set adrift 18 mi (29 km) away. Only three of the twenty-seven homes in Black Point, which lies along Deep Creek, remained after the storm. The storm surge along Andros Island's west coast killed ten people tending their crops in Southern Bight.

I regret exceedingly to report that on September 25, 26, and 27 the most destructive hurricane in the history of [Mangrove Cay] swept the island. Its extreme duration and sustained violence without precedent in my experience. The whole place appears as though burned with fire and fields once full of promise are naked stripped of all vegetation. The situation is the most serious the island has ever had to face.

— E. W. Forsyth, commissioner of Mangrove Cay

=== New Providence Island ===
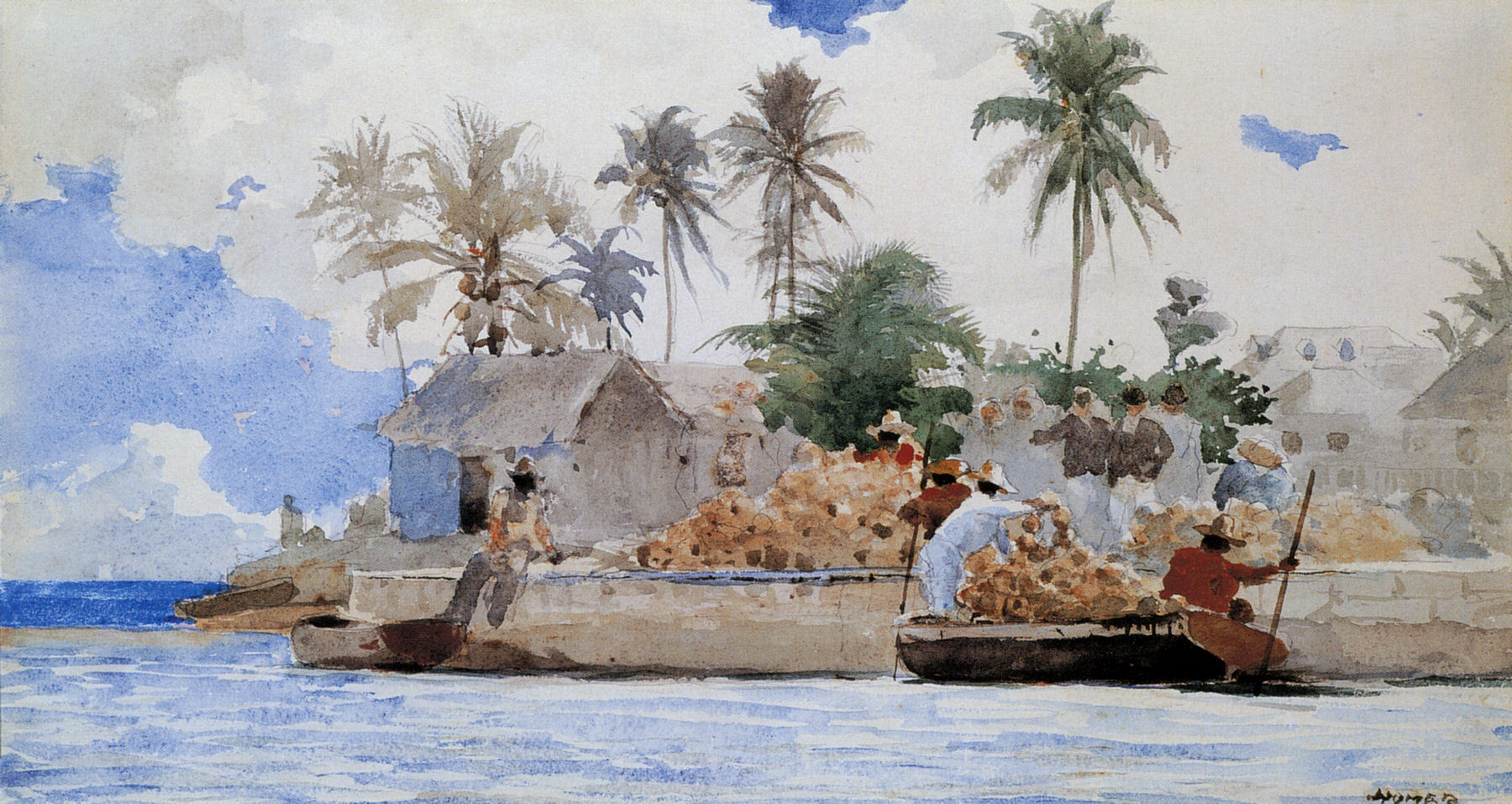
Watercolor of sponge fishermen by Winslow Homer. The declining sponging industry in The Bahamas was dealt a heavy blow by the 1929 hurricane.

Nassau received its first bulletin from the U.S. Weather Bureau on the morning of September 25, shortly before the onset of gale-force winds by noon and hurricane-force winds that evening. Sustained winds at Nassau reached an estimated 120–140 mph (195–225 km/h), punctuated by a maximum gust of 164 mph (264 km/h). The air pressure bottomed out at 936 mbar (hPa; 27.64 inHg). Radio contact between Florida and Nassau was lost between September 25 and the night of September 27. Few homes were left unscathed, with damage to private property "enormous" according to an Associated Press report and meteorologist Ivan Ray Tannehill. Many homes were unroofed, particularly in the colored quarter of Nassau. An estimated 73% of all homes and businesses in the city and 95% of churches were destroyed. Several of the remaining churches lost their roofs. The Government House's eastern wing was partially unroofed and the mansion of the Ministry of Education was razed. The police barracks and much of the prison lost their roofs; the prison's eventual repair was one of the costliest parts of the post-storm cleanup. Forty prisoners were released due to safety concerns. Parts of the Nassau hospital were damaged beyond repair, requiring demolition and reconstruction. The strength of the winds bent telephone poles at right angles to the ground and stripped the city's ceiba trees of their branches.

Nassau was also inundated by the storm surge and heavy rainfall, submerging parts of the city's southern district with over 4 ft (1.2 m) of water for several days. One street was submerged under 6 ft (1.8 m) of water. Water reached the second floor of a hotel, where a boat was later found. Floodwaters in homes were 18 in (0.46 m) deep in living rooms. Some people resorted to boring holes in the floors of their houses to drain the water. Potter's Cay was bifurcated by floodwaters. Fields, gardens, and orchards in Nassau were left in disarray. All poultry farms in Nassau were destroyed. On one chicken farm, only 90 of 500 chickens survived. Shipping in the Nassau area suffered a heavy blow. The hurricane wreaked havoc on Nassau Harbour, where many shipowners chose to remain on their ships, which were blown away and never recovered. The sponging fleet was a near-total loss. East Bay Street was littered by the remains of small boats. The mail steamer Princess Montagu was blown out of her harbor and stranded on Tony Rock. Her passengers and crew were rescued on September 25. Three other mail ships capsized in the hurricane, including the Priscilla, which serviced the Abaco Islands and Eleuthera; the Ollie Forde, which serviced Andres Island; and the Magic, which had also been fulfilling the Ollie Forde's duties. Long Wharf was also decimated by the storm. In total, nine people died in Nassau, including three drownings.

The shores of New Providence Island were tattered by the storm and their structure altered by the force of the waves. Coastal streets were washed out and nearby homes were wrecked. Storm surge flooded roads and swept away homes and parts of the seawall. Boulders and mounds of sand piled up along the main street on Western Esplanade. Sixty-four ships of various types on New Providence Island were destroyed. Numerous buildings throughout the island sustained the collapse of walls and loss of roofs. On some streets, no home was left standing. In total, 456 houses were destroyed and another 640 sustained severe damage throughout New Providence Island. Of the 13,000 people who lived on the island in 1929, over 5,000 were left without homes. Most schools were damaged, and severe impacts were wrought to churches, stores, and shipping. The fruit trees that served as the principal export of the Fox Hill neighborhood were blown down. At Grant's Town, homes were destroyed or unroofed. The eastern wall at Fort Montagu collapsed. Virtually all trees near the fort were denuded of their leaves and branches. One baby was killed and thirty people were stranded on Athol Island just off New Providence, with many others injured. Homes on Hog Island were swept away.

=== Aftermath ===
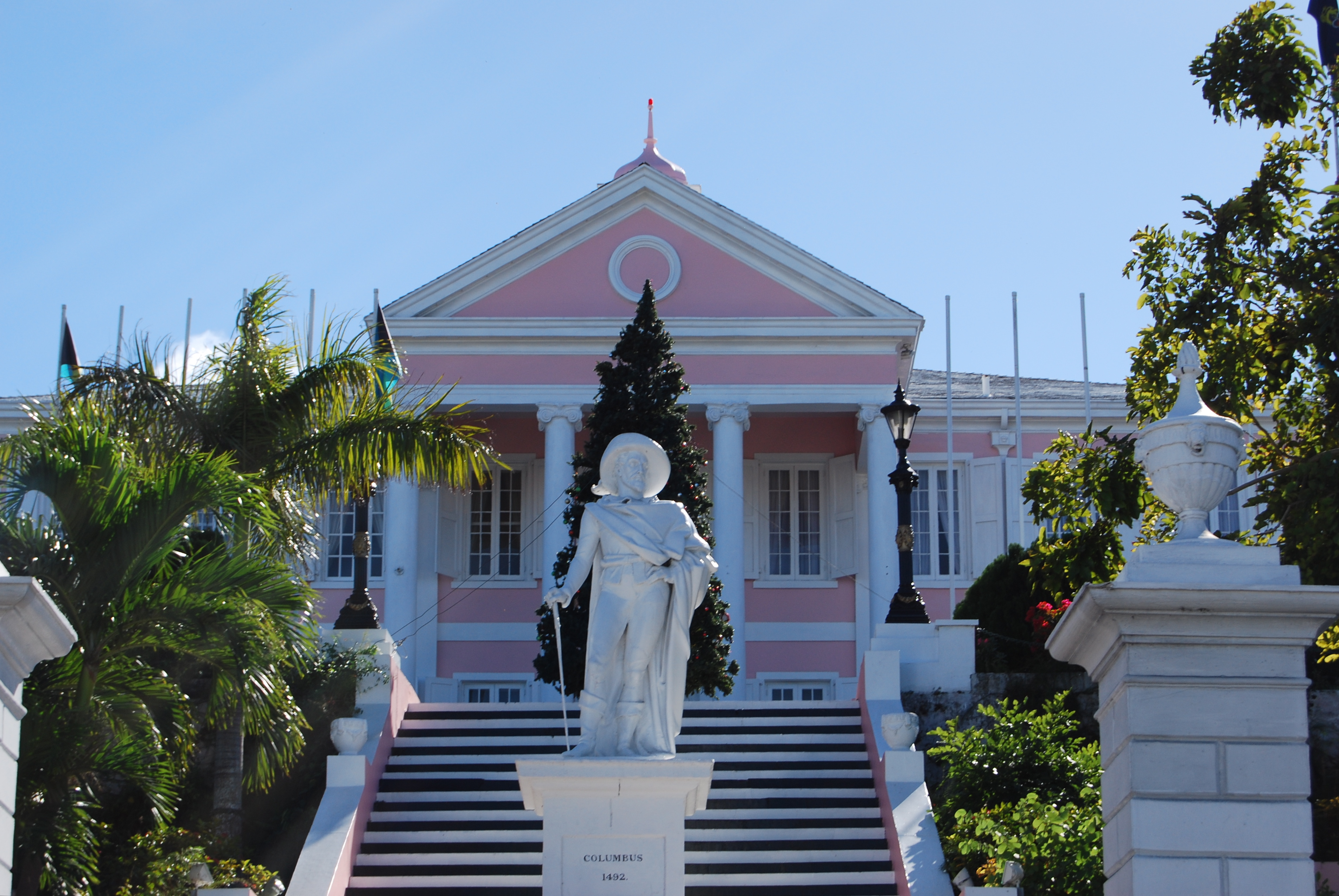
The Bahamas Government House in Nassau was repaired and remodeled after suffering extensive damage during the storm.

With their homes lost, many of the 300 people who sheltered at a church in Grant's Town on New Providence Island remained there for several weeks. Schools delayed their typical opening in September to October 7.

The House of Assembly of The Bahamas held a special session between October 16–24, 1929, authorizing relief funds for the islands after assessing the damage and reconstruction needs. The Bahamas Parliament passed The Poor People's Housing Hurricane Act of 1929, creating a hire purchase system through which the colonial government could lend £6,000 to individual tenants. The government could purchase homes for £40 each; at least 150 homes were provided to the homeless by the act. Approximately 77% of the Bahamian government's annual budgets in 1930 and 1931 were allocated towards repairing the damage caused by the hurricane. Relief efforts were organized by various groups, including the Bahamas Humane Society, Daughters of the Empire, Infant Welfare Association, and Wesleyan Methodist Missionary School. Aid from the central and southeastern islands in the Bahamas less seriously affected by the storm was hindered by an ongoing drought.

New building codes were enacted to better withstand the effects of hurricanes. Compliance with these codes was intended to secure buildings against winds up to 185 mph (300 km/h), mandating hurricane straps, tar paper, and vertical columns of steel-reinforced concrete on new construction. A new Ministry of Education building in Nassau was constructed on the grounds of the one destroyed by the storm. The Government House was repaired and remodeled following the storm. Wild birds were brought to the Bahamas from Jamaica to repopulate avian life on New Providence Island. The Board of Agriculture requested early-maturing vegetables from Jamaica and Trinidad. Legislation was passed that standardized procedures for hoisting hurricane signal flags, issuing a set of flags to all lighthouses of the British Imperial Lighthouse Service. Along with a fungal disease that killed 99% of sponges in the Bahamas, the storm precipitated the demise of the sponging industry in the colony, leading to tourism becoming the islands' chief industry. The song "Run Come See Jerusalem" by calypso artist Blake Alphonso Higgs, recorded in 1951 and one of the most recognized and recorded folk songs from the Bahamas, recalls the events concerning three ships that were caught in the storm, including the sinking of the Pretoria.

== Effects in the United States and Canada ==
=== Preparations ===
The U.S. Weather Bureau began issuing advisories on the storm on September 23, and continued warning on the storm at least twice daily until September 30 after it moved ashore a final time. Storm bulletins were broadcast every 30 minutes by local radio stations. Storm warnings were first issued on the afternoon of September 24 for areas between Miami, Florida, and Charleston, South Carolina. Weather Bureau forecasters were forced to frequently change the scope of their warnings due to the hurricane's slow movement, unusual southwesterly track, and lack of observations in the region. The bureau stated it was "impossible to locate the exact center or direction of movement" on September 26, with their storm bulletins communicating this uncertainty. Hurricane warnings were ultimately issued for the Florida Keys once the hurricane reached the Florida Straits on September 27. Additional hurricane warnings were later issued for coastal extents between Mississippi and Apalachicola, Florida, in advance of the storm's final landfall.

American and Cuban meteorologists initially anticipated the hurricane to strike Florida north of Miami. Although the storm was often erratic and difficult to precisely locate, its slow movement allowed for ample warning of potentially affected areas in Florida and time for storm preparations to be completed. In many Florida towns, all precautionary measures were in place by the night of September 25. The Florida Department of Health prepared to dispatch health specialists in the risk area. The 124th Infantry Regiment, serving as the Florida National Guard, was mobilized to assist in the hurricane aftermath if necessary. Emergency relief groups were formed in Broward, Dade, Okeechobee, and Palm Beach counties. The windows of homes and businesses along the coast were boarded up. Storeowners moved vulnerable awnings and signage away to safeguard their stores. Pan American Airlines suspended service between Miami and Havana, Cuba, and also evacuated ten planes from Miami worth $700,000 total to Havana. A partial evacuation of the Everglades was conducted on September 25; several hundred people sought refuge in West Palm Beach while others fled to Arcadia and Sebring. Free travel on railroads was arranged for Pahokee residents evacuating to Fort Myers, Tampa, and Sebring. Evacuees also left West Palm Beach for points farther north. Residents lining the coasts of Lake Okeechobee evacuated for higher ground, with Sebring serving as their most common haven.

Public buildings in the Fort Lauderdale area, such as the courthouse and public schools, were repurposed as shelters. Schools in the area dismissed at noon on September 26. Employees in both private businesses and municipal government were released early to allow individuals to prepare their personal property. In Miami, water reservoirs were filled to ensure adequate water supplies following the storm. Boats were moved into safer areas of harbor or out of the water, including ferries operating between West Palm Beach and Palm Beach. An emergency organization chaired by the American Red Cross and made of several committees was convened at the Comeau Building in West Palm Beach. Florida Power & Light increased its electricity supply to meet potential emergency demands for the West Palm Beach area. The municipal water and electricity plants in Lake Worth Beach suspended their operations during the storm's duration. Six hundred members of the American Legion around West Palm Beach were directed to convene and aid in emergency efforts under the supervision of the Red Cross. Another joint effort between the American Legion, Red Cross, and other volunteer groups was established in Miami. Similar units were formed in Jupiter and Lake Worth. The Red Cross designated the lobby of a hotel in West Palm Beach as an emergency hospital to process all medical and surgical cases during the storm.

Preparations in parts of mainland Florida were scaled back once it became evident that the storm would mostly affect the Florida Keys, with many businesses reopening after two days of closure. Schools were reopened in Broward County on September 27. The Weather Bureau advised evacuees from the Everglades that it was potentially safe to return home. With the storm's threat now magnified farther south, the United States Coast Guard cutter Tallapoosa was dispatched to Key West to render aid to ships in the area. Ferry service between Matecumbe Key and No Name Key was discontinued. For the hurricane's landfall in the Florida panhandle, the Weather Bureau recommended the evacuation of residents living along the coast in the Pensacola area.

=== Florida ===
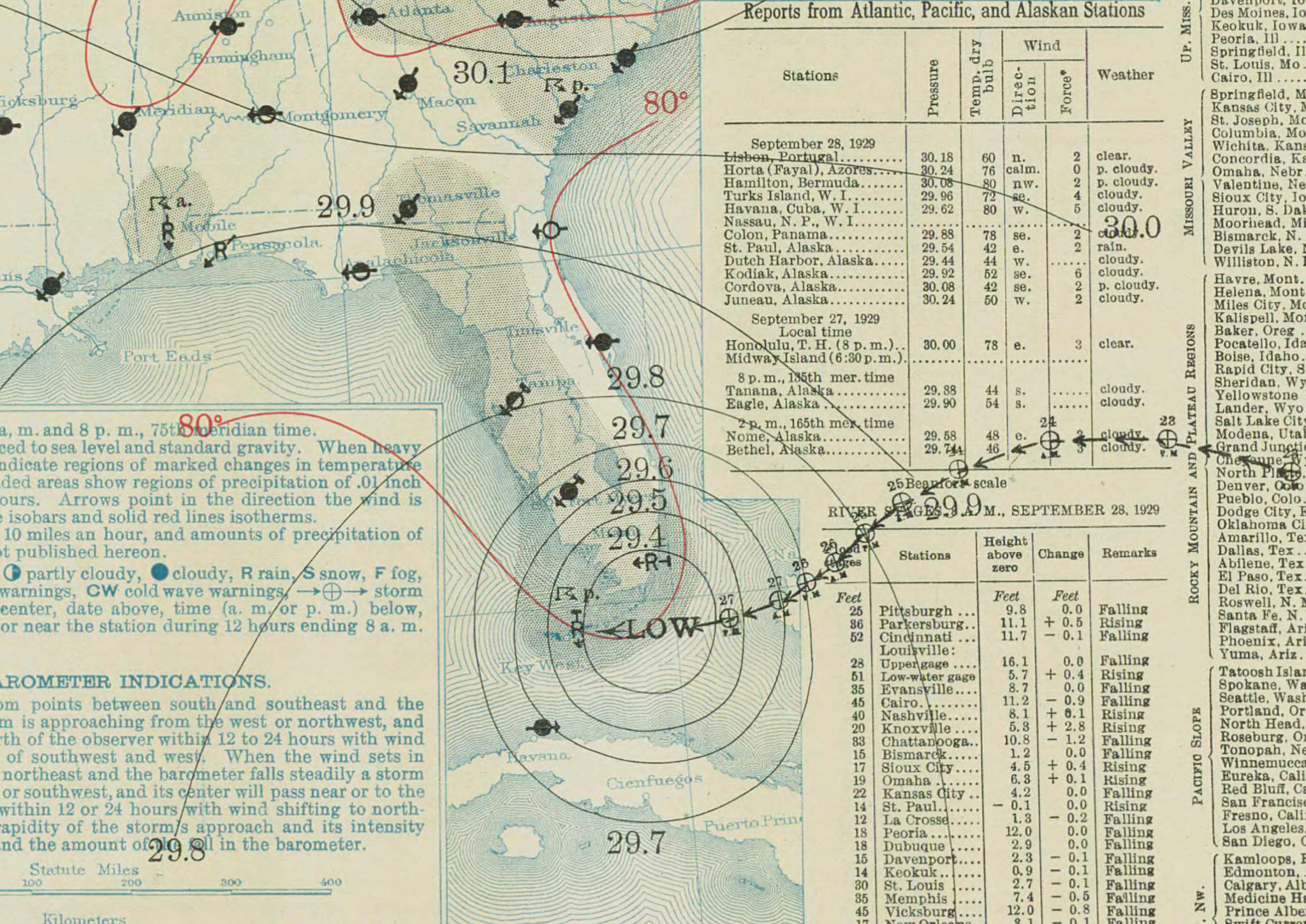
Surface weather map of the hurricane nearing landfall in the Florida Keys on September 28

The hurricane's track through the southernmost regions of Florida spared the more densely populated Gold Coast from the storm's worst effects. The resulting damage was "remarkably small for a storm of this character" according to the Weather Bureau, with the state incurring $676,000 in losses; other accounts estimated $821,000, while a figure of $1 million was published in the Bulletin of the American Meteorological Society. Property losses stemmed from both agricultural and utility interests, with damage maximized near the storm's center. Damage to highways accounted for an estimated $300,000 of the toll. Many miles of the Florida East Coast Railway were damaged. Three deaths occurred in Florida, with one each in Marathon, Panama City, and Wewahitchka. Another eight deaths occurred offshore due to the loss of the fishing schooner Mercia Montgomery, which departed from Apalachicola on September 28. The storm's slow forward motion contributed to torrential rainfall over South Florida, peaking at 10.63 in (270 mm) in Miami on September 28. Low-lying areas of the city were flooded. Inundation as deep as 3 ft (0.91 m) occurred in Homestead.

Damage in the Florida Keys was worst north of the hurricane's eye, such as in Cape Sable, Upper Matecumbe Key, southern Key Largo, and the Ten Thousand Islands. Storm surge heights reached 6–9 ft (1.8–2.7 m) in Garden Cove and washed out highways along the Keys out to Big Pine Key. A gust of 150 mph (240 km/h) was estimated in Key Largo, where the hurricane made landfall. Everglades City experienced winds of 90–100 mph (140–160 km/h) and 9 in (230 mm) of rainfall. Damage was wrought to 60–65 homes in both Everglades City and Dupont; they were all repaired within ten days. In Key West, small fishing boats in the upper harbor were overtaken by the high seas, and lighting and telephone service was disrupted; losses were estimated at a few thousand dollars. Railroad service in Key West was unavailable for a week, and mail was delivered to the city by the United States Coast Guard. In Miami, winds reached 58 mph (93 km/h), blowing down electric lines throughout the area and causing power outages in Miami Beach. Damage along the southwestern Florida coast was generally minor, with only minimal impacts north of Punta Rassa to Cedar Key. South of Florida City, a 12 mi (19 km)-stretch of railway roadbed required repairs due to storm damage. An estimated 20–30 percent of oranges and half of grapefruits in Lee County were damaged. Collier had the highest damage toll of any Florida county, sustaining $295,000 in damage. Loss of timber accounted for $150,000 of the total. However, losses sustained by fruit crops in Dade County were ultimately greater, reaching $1.5 million according to monthly records maintained by the National Centers for Environmental Information.

At least five tornadoes occurred in the hurricane's rainbands between Miami and Stuart, moving southeast to northwest with the storm's circulation. These were among the first verified reports of tornadoes occurring within a hurricane. Most of the tornadoes were short-lived and were limited to the coast, producing marginal damage. One tornado struck Fort Lauderdale, taking a 0.75 mi (1.21 km) long and 150–300 ft (46–91 m) wide path through the city's business center. Frame homes and garages were destroyed. Much of the roof and parapet of a 4-story concrete hotel was torn away by the twister. The tornado lifted within a minute of touching down and produced the severest impacts from the hurricane in Fort Lauderdale, inflicting $100,000 in damage and injuring 16 people, most of whom it flayed with airborne glass. In all it collided with 21 structures. Tornado historian Thomas P. Grazulis retroactively rated it F2 on the Fujita scale.

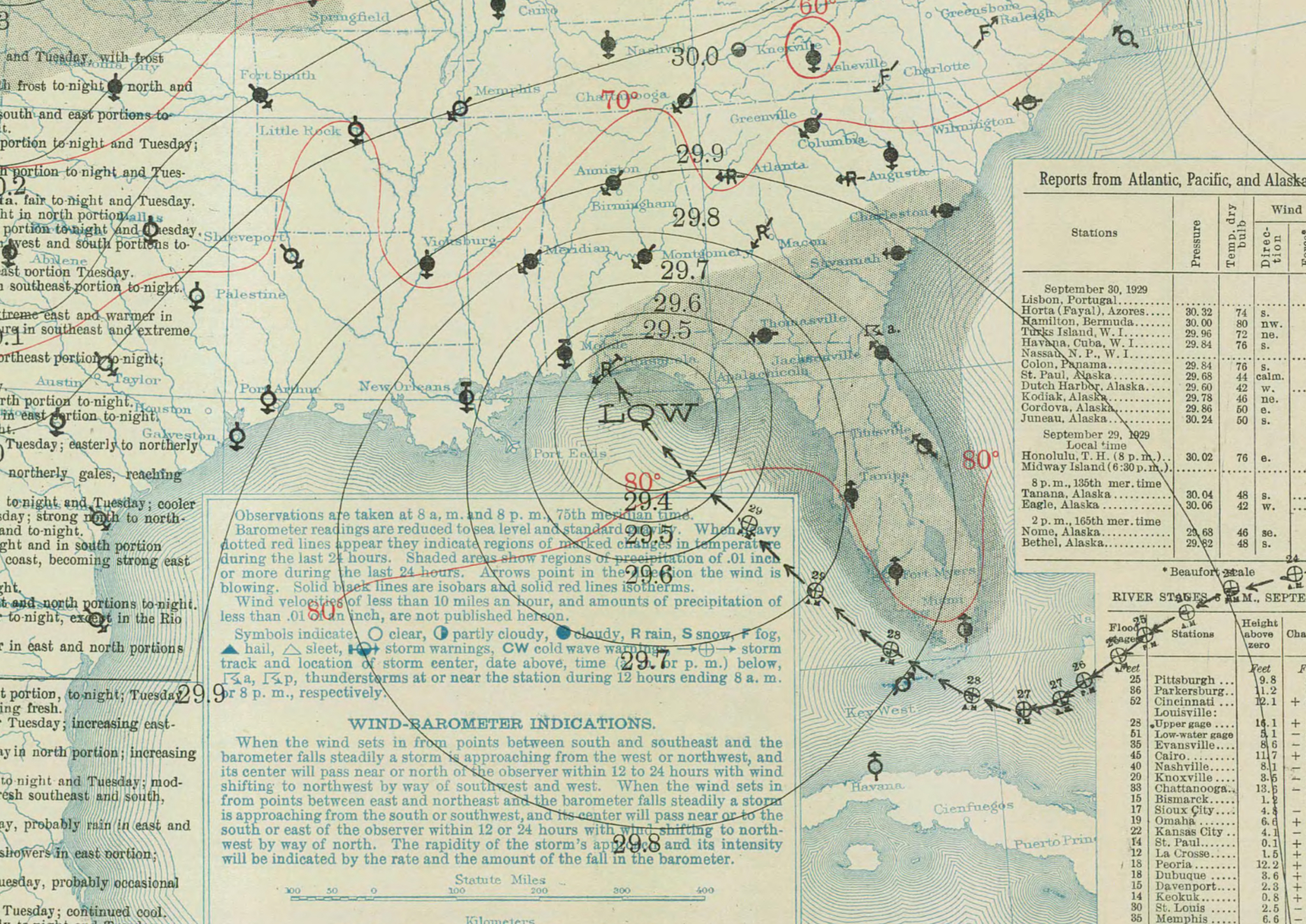
Weather map of the hurricane approaching landfall near Panama City, Florida on September 30

Gusts of 100 mph (160 km/h) accompanied the hurricane's landfall on the Florida panhandle, with winds near hurricane-force extending west to Pensacola where a peak gust of 102 mph (164 km/h) was recorded. The damage in Pensacola was estimated at $60,000. Docks and small craft were damaged, while trees and telegraph lines were downed. Citrus unshiu and pine trees saw significant impacts. Along the Apalachicola waterfront, the storm surge destroyed nearly all wharves and damaged all coastal fish and oyster storehouses and canning plants. The surge inundated low-lying portions of the city, flooding additional inland warehouses. Parts of a newly built coastal highway west of Apalachicola were washed out by the waves. Panama City incurred $100,000–$150,000 in damage from destroyed wharves and fish storehouses. Apalachicola incurred a $66,000 damage toll, primarily to shipping.

=== Eastern U.S. ===
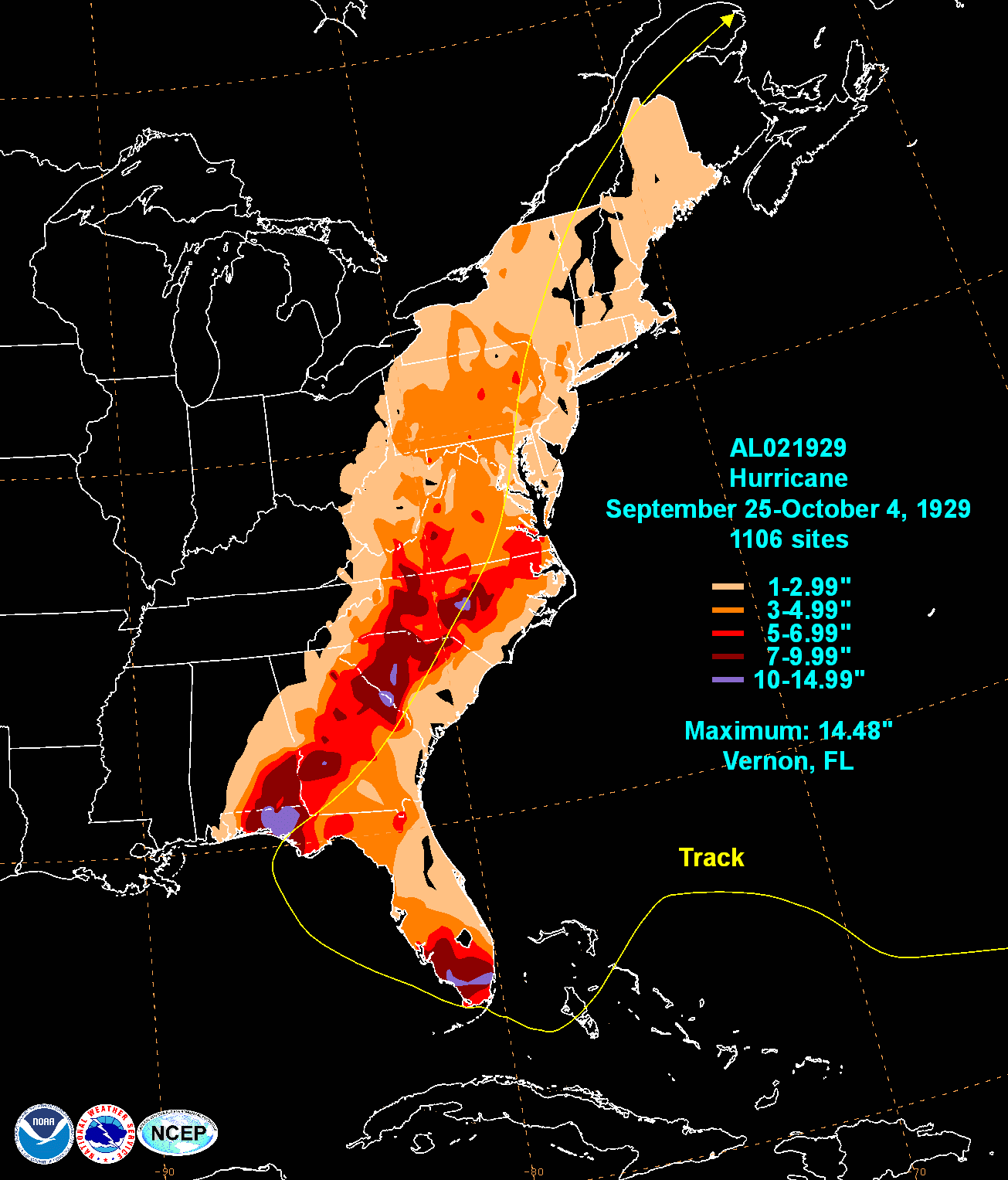
Map of the total rainfall across the United States from the hurricane

In Alabama, the damage was generally minor but most pronounced to crops. Coastal damage amounted to $1,800 excluding crop losses. The winds caused some damage to roofs and blew down fences. Citrus unshiu branches bearing fruit were torn from trees. Pecans suffered the same fate, though their quality remained at market-grade. While most cotton in Alabama's southeastern counties had already been harvested, extensive damage was wrought to the remaining crops.

Crops and property sustained considerable damage along the central and southern U.S. Atlantic coasts. The storm supplied a continuous stream of moisture and rainfall into the region from September 20 to October 1, causing rivers to flood their banks. The first part of this heavy rainfall event was attributed to a convergence zone that remained over the southeastern U.S. from September 23–28, repeatedly drawing moisture from the hurricane. Rains between September 30 and October 1 was associated with the interaction of tropical moisture and an eastward-moving cold front over the Southeastern U.S. The maximum rainfall total during the entire event was 20.0 in (510 mm) in Glennville, Georgia. Flooding in Georgia occurred in two episodes, with one on September 25 and the other from October 1–2. Two people were killed in the state. Flooding was widespread in Georgia's Lower Coastal Plain. Crops, especially cotton and corn, suffered a heavy blow in this region. The floods blocked highways and washed out railroads. One train engineer was killed after his train fell into a washout along the Central of Georgia Railway between Almira and Davisboro.

Areas in and around Augusta, Georgia, experienced damaging flooding.

The Savannah River was subject to a record flood. An average of 8.84 in (225 mm) of rain fell across its watershed in 34 hours. At Augusta, the river set a record river stage of 46.1 ft (14.1 m) on September 27. At this point, the river flow rate was also a record 370,000 ft^{3} (10,000 m^{3}) per second, 37 times greater than the river's flow rate at the onset of the rains. While most of Augusta was protected by a levee, a 250 ft (76 m) break 3 mi (4.8 km) south of the city led to the inundation of several streets and 40 city blocks to a depth of around 2–4 ft (0.61–1.22 m). In lower areas the flooding was up to 15 ft (4.6 m) deep. The break occurred as the river was descending from its crest, lessening the potential damage; the flooding was relieved further by the opening of flood gates at Butlers Creek and a secondary levee breach nearby. Most homes in the flood zone were elevated and avoided significant damage. With the onset of the second episode of floods towards the beginning of October, police and fire departments ordered the evacuation of residents in low-lying areas, fearing that the earlier floods had significantly weakened flood mitigation systems. A crew of conscripts and volunteers was assembled to fortify the levees, successfully repairing broken segments before the Savannah River's second crest. Manufacturing and oil plants in low-lying areas north of Augusta were damaged by the floods. Much of the floodplain towards South Carolina was submerged by the swollen Savannah. Farms suffered a total loss of crops and farm equipment. Numerous heads of cattle, hogs, and mules drowned. The total cost of damage within a 50 mi (80 km) radius of Augusta was estimated at over $1 million, with $275,000 in damage in the city proper. In Columbia County, located north of Augusta, agricultural losses exceeded $200,000. Floods classified as "dangerous" by the Weather Bureau occurred along the Altamaha, Ocmulgee, and Oconee rivers; more moderate floods befell areas along the Aplachicola, Chattahoochee, and Flint rivers. Total losses in the Altamaha River basin amounted to $500,000. In the southwestern part of Georgia, damage from the storm was primarily wind-driven, and many pecans were blown from trees. A conservative estimate from the Weather Bureau appraised damage to agriculture, highways, and railroads at $3 million.

Flood damage in South Carolina from heavy rains on September 26–27 were exacerbated by additional rains associated with the hurricane on September 30 and October 1. Heavy rains and strong winds swept across the Piedmont. The entire state recorded above-average rainfall for October due in part to the hurricane. In Hamburg, which lies across the Savannah River opposite Augusta, Georgia, many homes were swept away by floodwaters. Eight dams were breached in the Horse Creek Valley. Damage in the Santee River watershed totaled $1.1 million, with most due to property damage; $160,000 in property damage was estimated to have been mitigated by timely flood warnings. Total losses in South Carolina from flooding associated with the storm reached $3.829 million, of which $1.8 million was inflicted upon crops. Farming operations in South Carolina's northern and western counties were suspended across both uplands and lowlands.

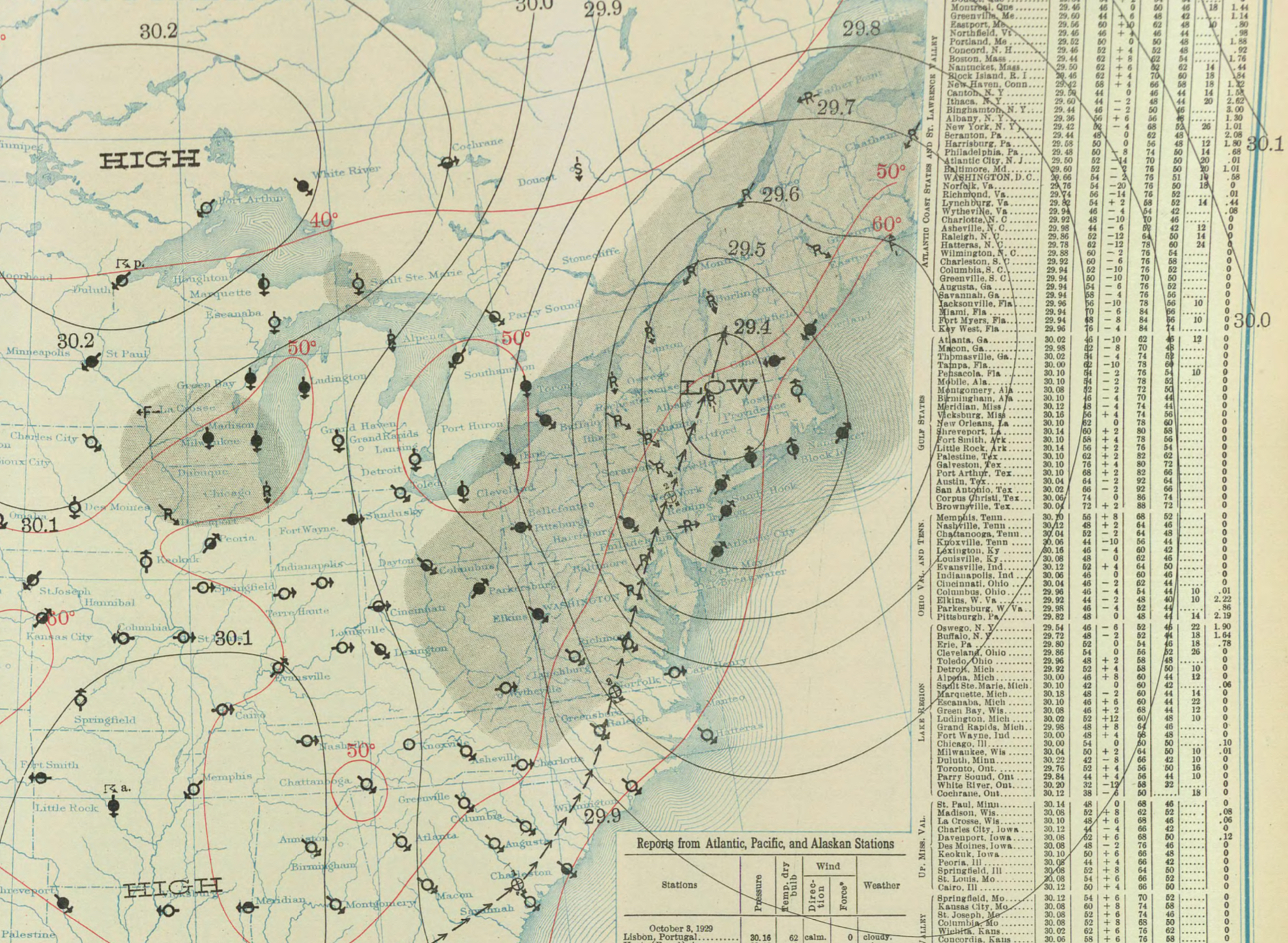
Weather map of the hurricane's extratropical remnants over the Northeast United States on October 3

The Cape Fear River in North Carolina experienced its third highest flood on record, leading to $800,000 in losses. However, further losses were avoided as crops were already partly harvested. Areas downstream were also afforded clear conditions during which crops and other stocks were moved to safety as the bulge of floodwaters flowed downstream. October 1929 became the North Carolina's rainiest October on record upon its conclusion. In Virginia, highways and bridges were damaged by flooded streams. Southside and Southwest Virginia were the parts of the state most heavily impacted. High surf and damaging winds spread northward to the Mid-Atlantic states and New England, causing heavy damage. Trees were blown down in The Berkshires by strong winds enhanced by the local topography. In Maine, heavy rains up to 1.88 inches (48 mm) flooded storm cellars and broke a prolonged dry spell in the state, though damage was minimal.

=== Canada ===
The extratropical remnants of the hurricane exhibited winds of 40 mph (65 km/h) as they passed over New Brunswick and Quebec. Heavy rainfall and flooding were reported in New Brunswick and Nova Scotia. A peak rainfall total of 3.8 in (95 mm) was measured in Saint John, New Brunswick. Cellars and streets in the Saint John area had flood depths of 1 ft (0.30 m). Streets were flooded and damaged in Digby and Truro, Nova Scotia.

== See also ==
- 1926 Nassau hurricane – passed directly over Nassau at a similar intensity
- Hurricane Betsy – took a similar southwestward path through the Bahamas and Florida Keys
- Hurricane Dorian – slow-moving Category 5 hurricane that caused catastrophic damage on Grand Bahama and Great Abaco islands
