= List of creeks of the Bahamas =

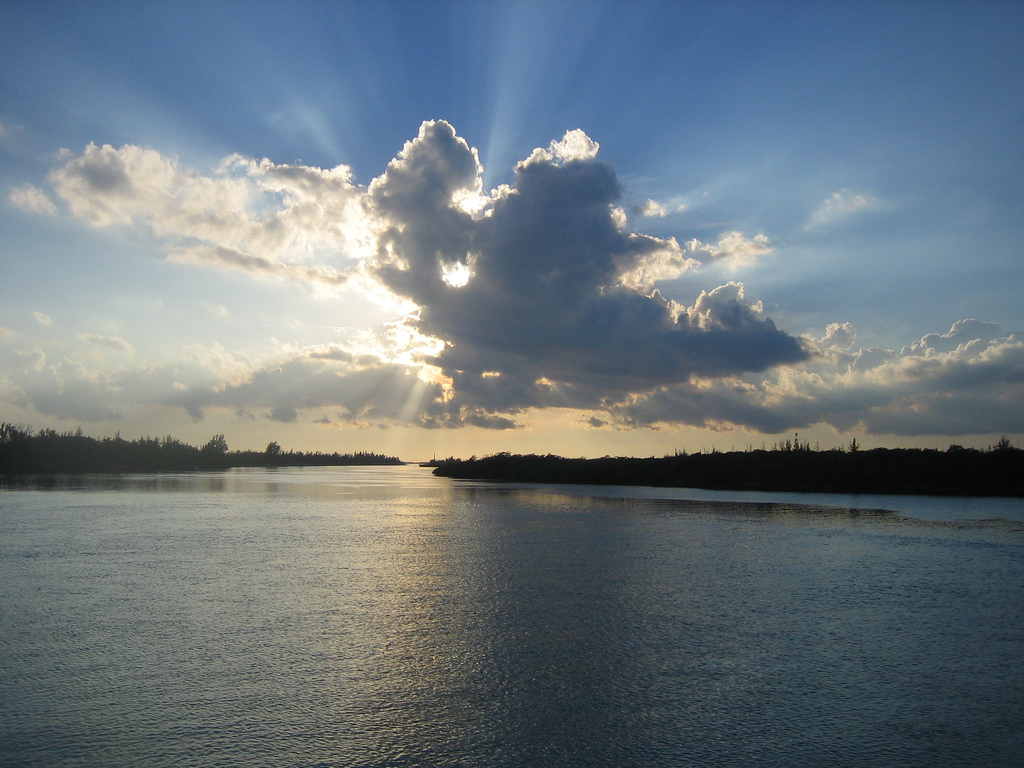

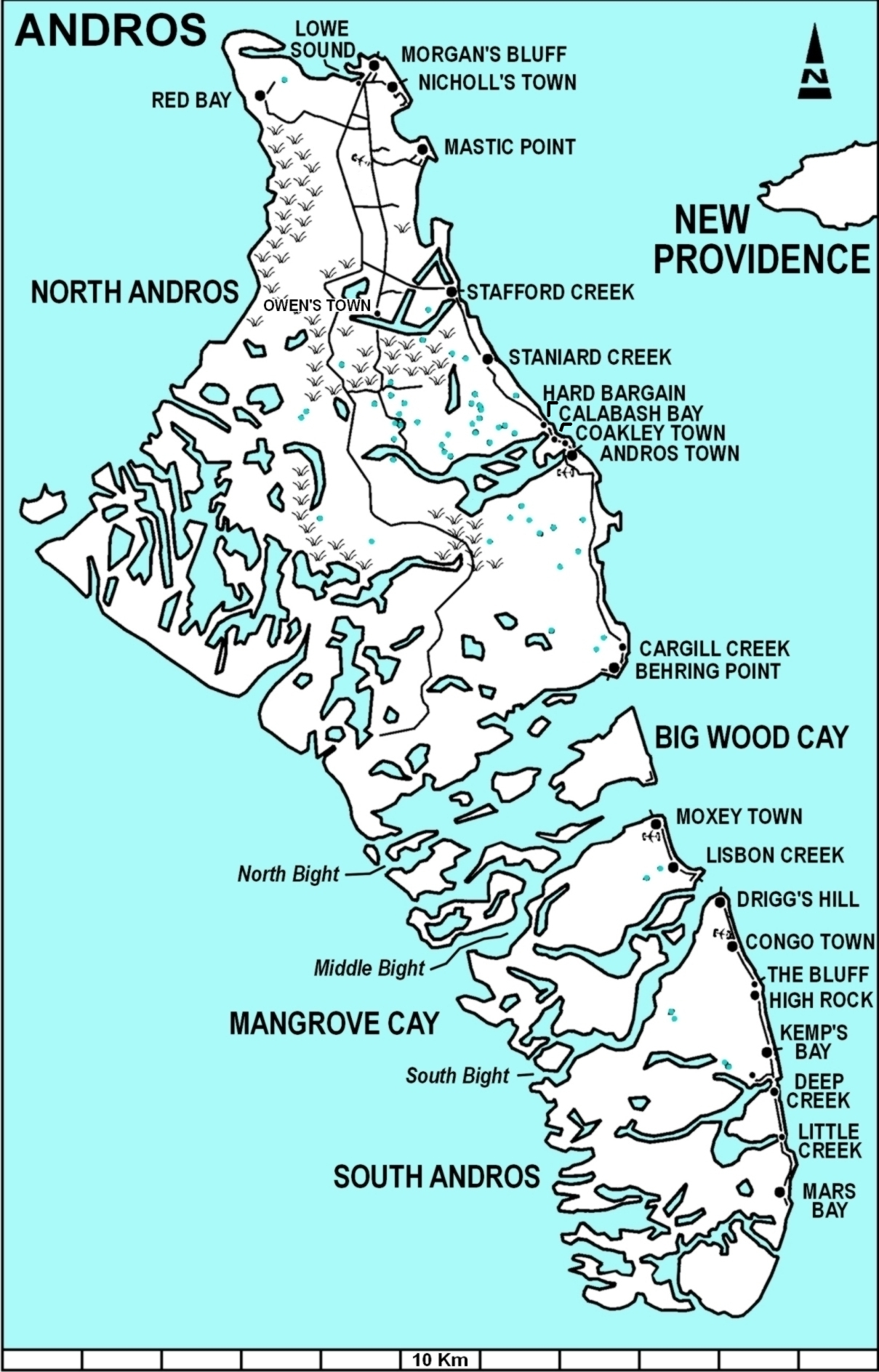
Andros Island

This is a list of creeks of the Bahamas in alphabetical order for islands that have creeks. There is only one river in the Bahamas, the Goose River in Central Andros. There are also many tidal creeks, which resemble rivers.

In March 2018, waves breaking over cliffs near the Glass Window Bridge in Eleuthera caused a flow of water across the island that washed out the Queens Highway, and was temporarily called a new river.

== Andros Island ==
The river and creeks on Andros Island include the following:

Andros Island creeks and rivers
Name	Location
Cargill Creek	Central Andros, Cargill Cay
Deep Creek	North Andros, Deep Creek
Deep Creek	South Andros, 23.99164°N 77.53028°W
Fresh Creek	North Andros, Fresh Creek
Goose River	Central Andros
Grassy Creek	South Andros, 23.79198°N 77.53418°W
Hawk Creek	North Andros
Lisbon Creek	Mangrove Cay
Little Grassy Creek	South Andros
Loggerhead Creek	North Andros
Mount Creek	North Andros
Pelican Creek	North Andros
River Lees	North Andros, Fresh Creek
Sandy Creek	North Andros
Sapodilla Creek	North Andros
Simon Creek	North Andros
Somerset Creek	North Andros
Stafford Creek	North Andros, Stafford Creek, 24.89435°N 77.93692°W
Staniard Creek	North Andros
Timber Creek	North Andros
Wide Opening	Fresh Creek, 24.41667°N 78.18333°W

== Eleuthera Island ==
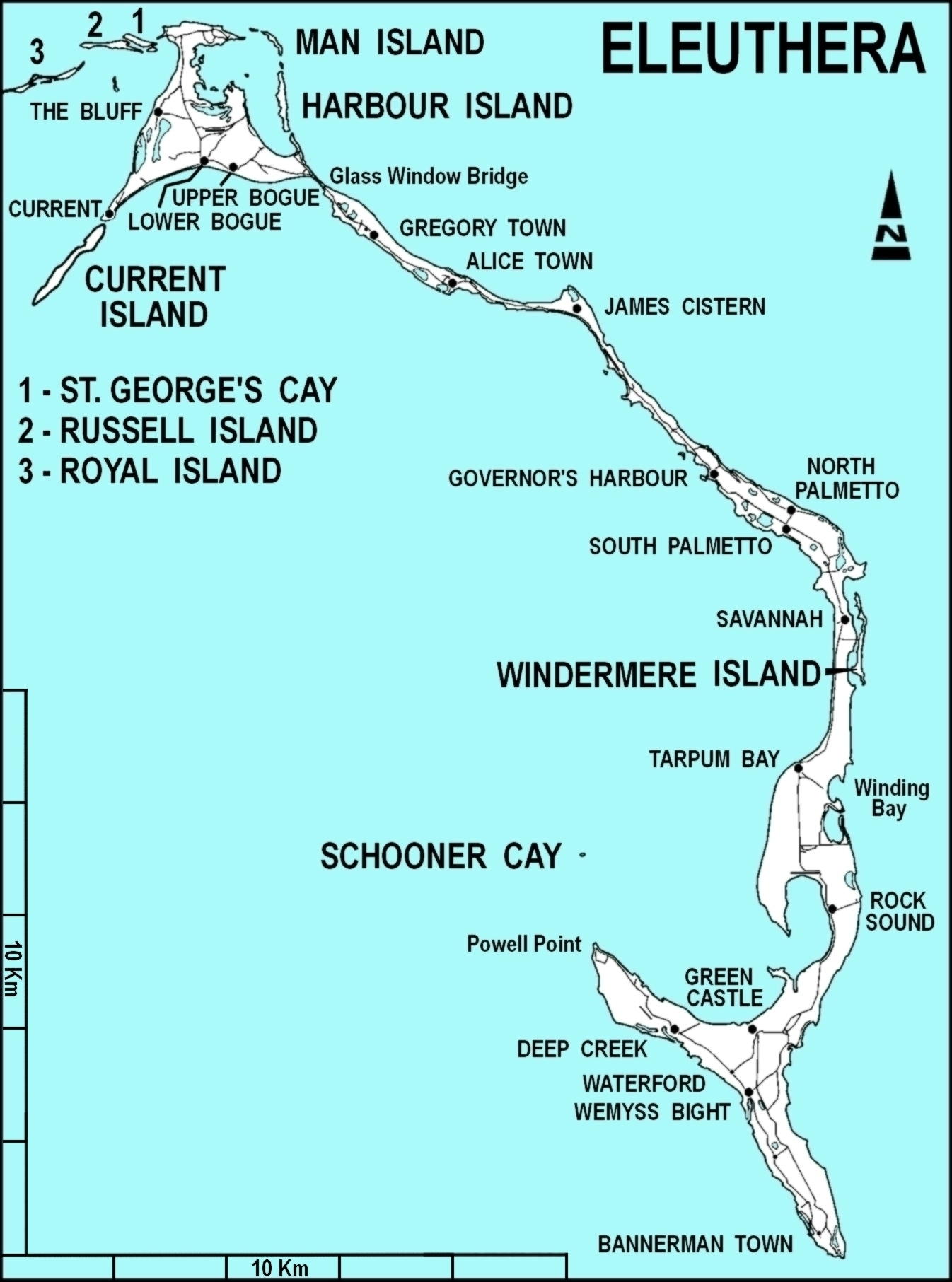
Eleuthera Island

There is one creek on Eleuthera Island. There is a town in South Eleuthera that is named Deep Creek.

- Starve Creek, 24°49′N 76°11′W

== Berry Islands ==
There is one known creek on Berry Islands:

- Stafford Creek, Berry Islands, 25.9°N 77.93333°W (??)

== Abaco Islands ==
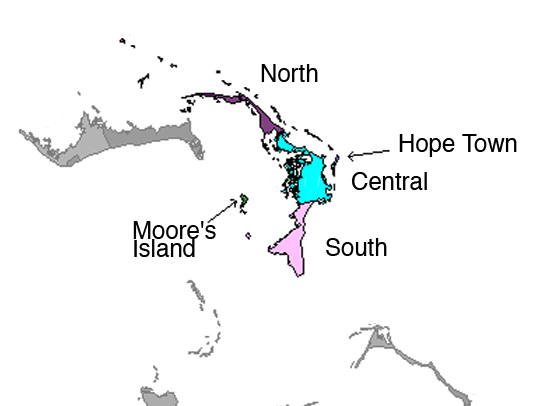
Abaco Islands

The Abaco Islands have following tidal creeks:

Andros Island creeks and rivers
Name	Location	Coordinates
Big Lake Creek	Hope Town	26.67326°N 77.29938°W
Big Mangrove Creek (marine channel)	North Abaco	26.816°N 77.94458°W
Bill Bride Creek	North Abaco	26.8264°N 77.91524°W
Broad Creek	Central Abaco	26.48601°N 77.04139°W
Calcutta Creek	Central Abaco	26.53104°N 77.04929°W
Coconut Creek	Hope Town	26.64461°N 77.0754°W
Deals Creek	Central Abaco	26.59465°N 77.29555°W
Don't Bluff Creek	Central Abaco	26.57756°N 77.2465°W
Far Creek	Central Abaco	26.54242°N 77.06741°W
First Creek	Central Abaco	26.63717°N 77.34051°W
Fish Creek	Central Abaco	26.66073°N 77.3213°W
Hills Creek	Central Abaco	26.63691°N 77.27926°W
Hills Creek	Central Abaco	26.63256°N 77.272°W
Israel Creek	Central Abaco	26.57098°N 77.17886°W
Joe's Creek	Central Abaco	26.62675°N 77.26426°W
Little Creek	Central Abaco	26.63421°N 77.43345°W
Loggerhead Creek	Central Abaco	25.1°N 78.18333°W
Mangrove Creek	Central Abaco	26.68596°N 77.40234°W
Mangrove Creek	North Abaco	26.68596°N 77.40234°W
Mitchell Creek	Central Abaco	26.67344°N 77.34536°W
Nigh Creek	Central Abaco	26.54215°N 77.06226°W
Nimble Creek	Central Abaco	26.65039°N 77.29272°W
Okra Creek	Central Abaco	26.60169°N 77.22279°W
Sand Banks Harbour	Hope Town	26.67908°N 77.30798°W
Second Creek	Central Abaco	26.64096°N 77.33598°W
Senacord Creek	Central Abaco	26.51847°N 77.0484°W
Treasure Cay Creek	Cape Town	26.67106°N 77.27929°W
Turtle Creek	Central Abaco	26.51175°N 77.04788°W
Wallace Creek	Central Abaco	26.59952°N 77.21358°W
Wills Cay Creek	Central Abaco	26.58304°N 77.22684°W
Will's Creek	Central Abaco	24.36437°N 78.1015°W

== Mangrove Cay ==
- Miller Creek, 24.02071°N 77.83847°W

== Grand Bahama ==
There are one tidal creek and one channel in Grand Bahama:

- Thrift Harbor Creek, tidal creek, East Grand Bahama, 26.55°N 77.85°W
- Hawksbill Creek, channel, West Grand Bahama, 26.53333°N 78.71667°W

== See also ==
- List of rivers of the Americas
