= Miss Bahamas 2010 =

- Date: May 6, 2010
- Venue: Imperial Ballroom in the Atlantis Resort, Paradise Island, The Bahamas
- Broadcaster: ZNS-TV
- Entrants: 18
- Placements: 10
- Winner: Braneka Bassett; East Grand Bahama

The Miss Bahamas 2010 pageant was held on May 6, 2010. This year only 18 candidates were competing for the national crown. The chosen winner will represent The Bahamas at the Miss Universe 2010 and Miss World 2010. The winner of best national costume, the costume will be use in Miss Universe 2010. The First Runner Up entered Miss Intercontinental and the Second Runner Up entered Miss Supranational. Braneka Bassett of East Grand Bahama emerged victorious at the end of the contest. Bassett was the first titleholder of the newly merged Miss Bahamas title. Prior to this edition Miss Bahamas World and Miss Bahamas Universe were separate contests but were merged when the Miss Bahamas Organization acquired the Miss Universe license after having the Miss World license for several years. This continue until 2013 when the Miss Bahamas Organization (MBO) restructured the pageant and separated them into two separate pageants. In the following two editions where the pageant was still merged, to winners were crowned, one for Miss Universe and the other for Miss World. MBO would keep them separate until after Miss Universe 2015 when they lost the Miss Universe license. Today they only have the license for Miss World.

== Final results ==
Final results	Contestant
Miss Bahamas 2010	East Grand Bahama - Braneka Bassett
1st Runner-up	New Providence - Anastagia Pierre
2nd Runner-up	South Andros - Janay Pyfrom
3rd Runner-up	West Grand Bahama - Kastachia Stuart
4th Runner-up	North Andros - Lataj Henfield
Semifinalist	Central Abaco - Sharie Delva; Green Turtle Cay - Shakell Seymour; Harbour Island - Alia Sands; Inagua - Amy Sands; Mangrove Cay - Azaria Clare

=== Special awards ===
- Miss Congeniality - Janay Pyfrom (South Andros)
- Beauty With a Purpose - Janay Pyfrom (South Andros)
- Best Talent - Janay Pyfrom (South Andros)
- Best Body - Braneka Bassett (East Grand Bahama)
- Top Model - Kendra Beneby (Berry Islands)
- Best National Costume - Lataj Henfield (North Andros)

== Official Delegates ==
Represent	Contestant	Age	Height	Hometown	Sponsor
Acklins	Dolnesha Wemys	22	1.70 m (5 ft 7 in)	Nassau	U Dazzle Me Boutique
Berry Islands	Kendra Beneby	19	1.71 m (5 ft 7 1/2 in)	Great Harbour Cay	Theodore Elyett Productions
Capital City	Elizabeth Blackwell	21	1.82 m (5 ft 11 1/2 in)	Nassau	
Central Abaco	Sharie Delva	24	1.74 m (5 ft 8 1/2 in)	Marsh Harbour	Sigma Management
Central Andros	Carol Stubbs	23	1.76 m (5 ft 9 1/2 in)	Nassau	Cinderella
East Grand Bahama	Braneka Bassett	20	1.75 m (5 ft 9 in)	Freeport	The Copier Ltd
Freeport	Maxine Louis	19	1.79 m (5 ft 10 1/2 in)	Freeport	Tyler's Classic Wear
Green Turtle Cay	Shakell Seymour	18	1.83 m (6 ft 0 in)	Nassau	The Beauty Shack
Harbour Island	Alia Sands	19	1.70 m (5 ft 7 in)	Freeport	Vizcaya
Inagua	Amy Sands	22	1.77 m (5 ft 9 1/2 in)	Matthew Town	Brenee's Fashion
Long Island	Lathyra Tinker	20	1.69 m (5 ft 6 1/2 in)	Clarence Town	Flaunt it Boutique
Mangrove Cay	Azaria Clare	22	1.68 m (5 ft 6 in)	Mangrove Cay	Text & Play / Asue Draw
New Providence	Anastagia Pierre	21	1.81 m (5 ft 11 1/2 in)	Nassau	Blue Bird Juice
North Abaco	Deonva Bodie	20	1.72 m (5 ft 7 1/2 in)	Nassau	Black Opal Cosmetics
North Andros	Lataj Henfield	20	1.78 m (5 ft 10 in)	Nassau	Revere Academy of Excellence
South Abaco	Immacula Pierre	19	1.71 m (5 ft 7 1/2 in)	Freeport	Unique Hair & Nails
South Andros	Janay Pyfrom	22	1.77 m (5 ft 9 1/2 in)	Nassau	Pantene Pro-V
West Grand Bahama	Kastachia Stuart	18	1.73 m (5 ft 8 in)	Freeport	Miss West Grand Bahama
