= Stafford Creek =

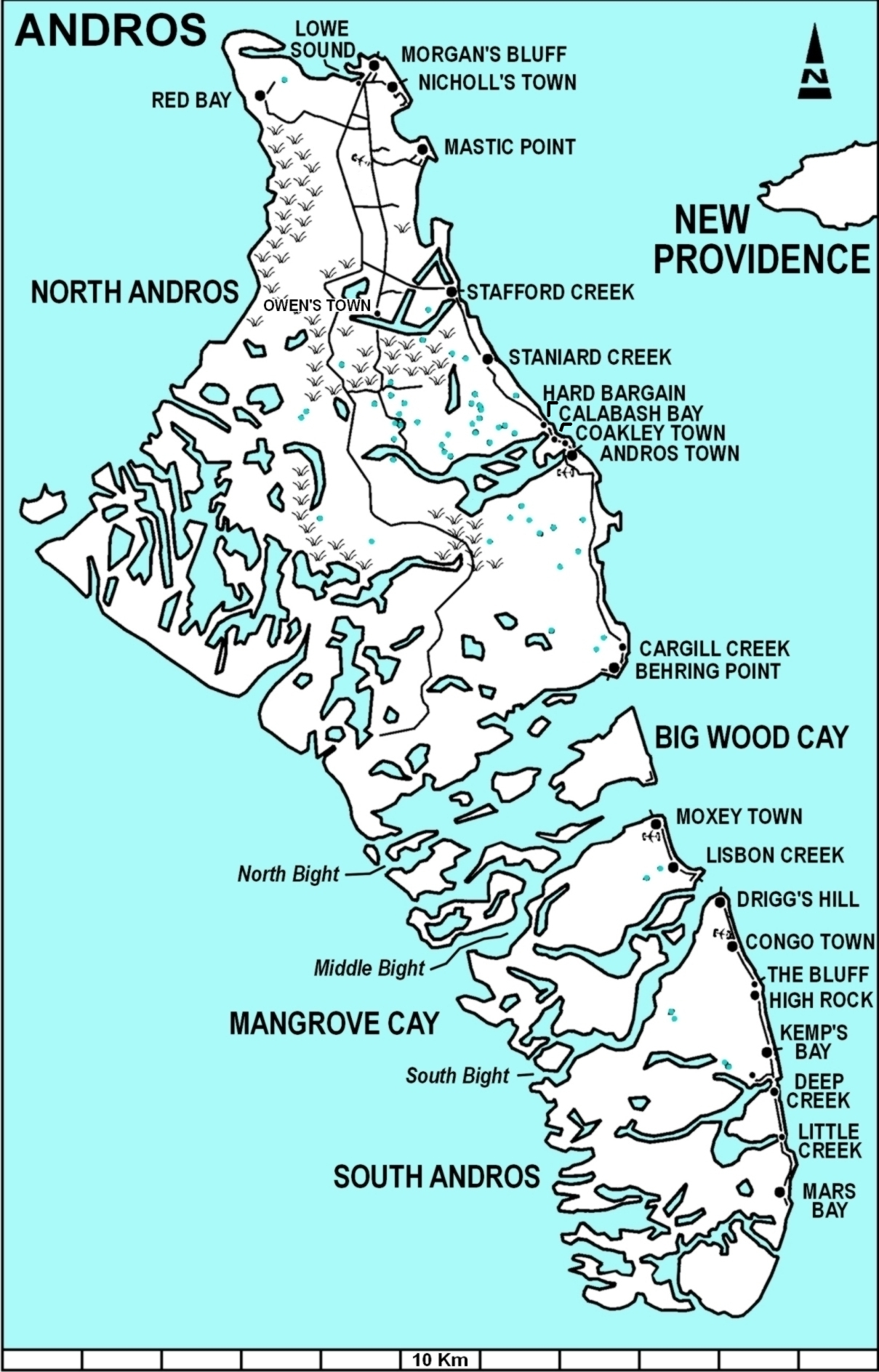

- Location within Bahamas
- Coordinates: 24°52′36″N 77°54′43″W
- Country: Bahamas
- Island: Andros
- District: North Andros

Population (2010)
  - Total: 98
- Time zone: UTC-5 (Eastern Time Zone)
- Area code: 242

Stafford Creek is a town on North Andros Island in the Bahamas. It is about 3 miles (4.8 km) north of Staniard Creek and about 40 miles (64 km) west of Nassau and about 160 miles (260 km) southeast of Miami. In 2010, the town had a population of 98.

The main road in Stafford creek is off the Queen's Highway. Stafford Creek relies on fly fishing. The closest airport is 15 miles (24 km) north, near Nicholls Town.

Stafford Creek is also the name given to a tidal creek in North Andros. There is also a Stafford Creek on Berry Islands.

== See also ==
- Nicholls Town
- Islands of the Bahamas
- List of rivers of the Bahamas
