= Loggerhead Creek =

- Location of mouth

Location
- Country: The Bahamas

Physical characteristics
- Mouth
  - location: North Andros
  - coordinates: 25°6′0″N 78°11′0″W

The Loggerhead Creek is a tidal stream in North Andros the Bahamas.

There are also a Loggerhead Creek and Little Loggerhead Creek in Central Andros.

== See also ==
- List of rivers of the Bahamas
