= Little Grassy Creek =

River in the Bahamas

- Location of mouth

Location
- Country: The Bahamas

Physical characteristics
- Mouth
  - location: South Andros
  - coordinates: 23°46′N 77°32′W

The Little Grassy Creek is a tidal creek in South Andros, the Bahamas. Little Grassy Creek is a tributary of Grassy Creek (23.79198°N 77.53418°W). There are also Grassy Creek Cays.

== See also ==
- List of rivers of the Bahamas
