= Goose River (Bahamas) =

River in The Bahamas

- Location of mouth

Location
- Country: The Bahamas

Physical characteristics
- Source
  - location: Central Andros
- Mouth
  - location: Central Andros
  - coordinates: 24°21′N 78°06′W

The Goose River is a river of The Bahamas. While there are many tidal creeks in The Bahamas, the Goose River is the only river. The Goose is about 24 kilometres (15 mi) long and situated on Andros, the largest island in the Bahamas chain.

== See also ==
- List of creeks of The Bahamas
