= Hawk Creek =

Hawk Creek may refer to:

- Hawk Creek (Bahamas), a stream in the Bahamas
- Hawk Creek (Minnesota), a stream in Minnesota
- Hawk Creek (Columbia River), a stream in Washington

== See also ==
- Hawk Creek Township, Renville County, Minnesota
