= Sapodilla Creek =

River in the Bahamas

- Location of mouth

Location
- Country: The Bahamas

Physical characteristics
- Mouth
  - location: North Andros
  - coordinates: 24°31′N 78°18′W
  - elevation: 0 ft (0 m)

The Sapodilla Creek is a tidal creek in North Andros, the Bahamas.

== See also ==
- List of rivers of the Bahamas
