= Sandy Creek (Bahamas) =

- Location of mouth

Location
- Country: The Bahamas

Physical characteristics
- Mouth
  - location: North Andros
  - coordinates: 24°48′N 77°52′W
  - elevation: 0 ft (0 m)

The Sandy Creek is a tidal creek in North Andros, In the Bahamas. It is located northwest of Andros Town and southeast of Owens Town, near Stafford and Staniard Creeks.

== See also ==
- List of rivers of the Bahamas
