= River Lees =

River in the Bahamas

- Location of mouth

Location
- Country: The Bahamas

Physical characteristics
- Mouth
  - location: Fresh Creek, Andros Island
  - coordinates: 24°29′N 78°06′W

The River Lees is a stream in Fresh Creek, Andros Island, The Bahamas.

== See also ==
- List of rivers of the Bahamas
