= Lisbon Creek =

- Location of mouth

Location
- Country: The Bahamas

Physical characteristics
- Mouth
  - location: Mangrove Cay, Andros Island
  - coordinates: 24°13′N 77°39′W

The Lisbon Creek is a river in Mangrove Cay, the Bahamas.

== See also ==
- List of rivers of the Bahamas
