= Mount Creek =

- Location of mouth

Location
- Country: The Bahamas

Physical characteristics
- Mouth
  - location: North Andros
  - coordinates: 24°39′N 78°23′W

The Mount Creek is a river North Andros, the Bahamas.

== See also ==
- List of rivers of the Bahamas
