= Deep Creek (Bahamas) =

Creek in North Andros, the Bahamas

- Location of mouth

Location
- Country: The Bahamas

Physical characteristics
- Mouth
  - location: Deep Creek, North Andros
  - coordinates: 24°46′N 78°18′W

The Deep Creek is a tidal creek in North Andros, the Bahamas.

== See also ==
- List of rivers of the Bahamas
