= Starve Creek =

River in the Bahamas

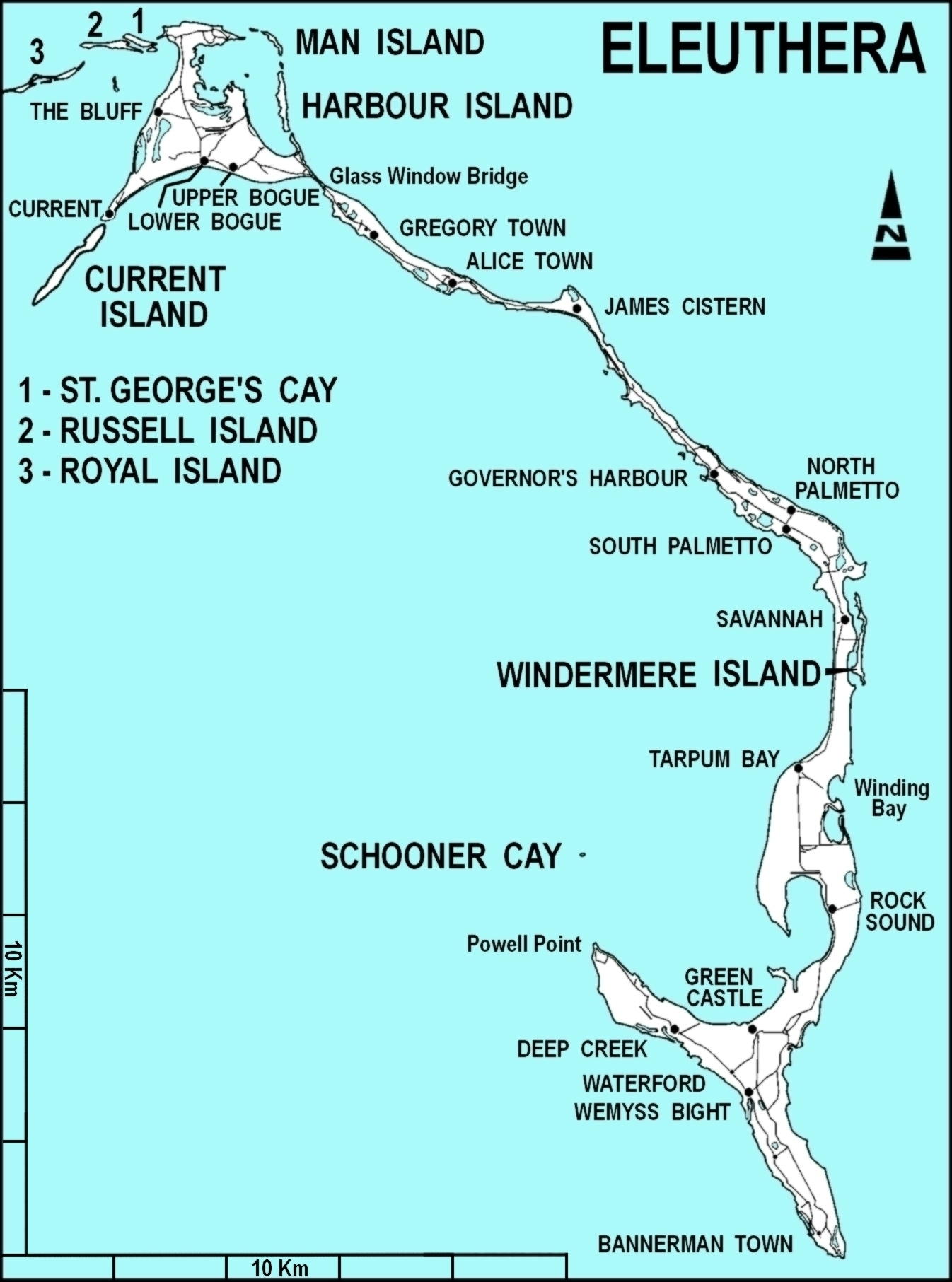
- Eleuthera Island

- Location of mouth

Location
- Country: The Bahamas

Physical characteristics
- Mouth
  - location: South Eleuthera
  - coordinates: 24°49′N 76°11′W

The Starve Creek is a tidal creek in South Eleuthera, the Bahamas.

== See also ==
- List of rivers of the Bahamas
