= Tidal stream =

Tidal stream may refer to:

- Tidal stream (marine science), currents associated with the tides
- Tidal stream (astrophysics), streams of stars and gas
- Tidal creek or tidal channel, a narrow inlet or estuary that is affected by the ebb and flow of ocean tides
