= Fresh Creek =

Fresh Creek District
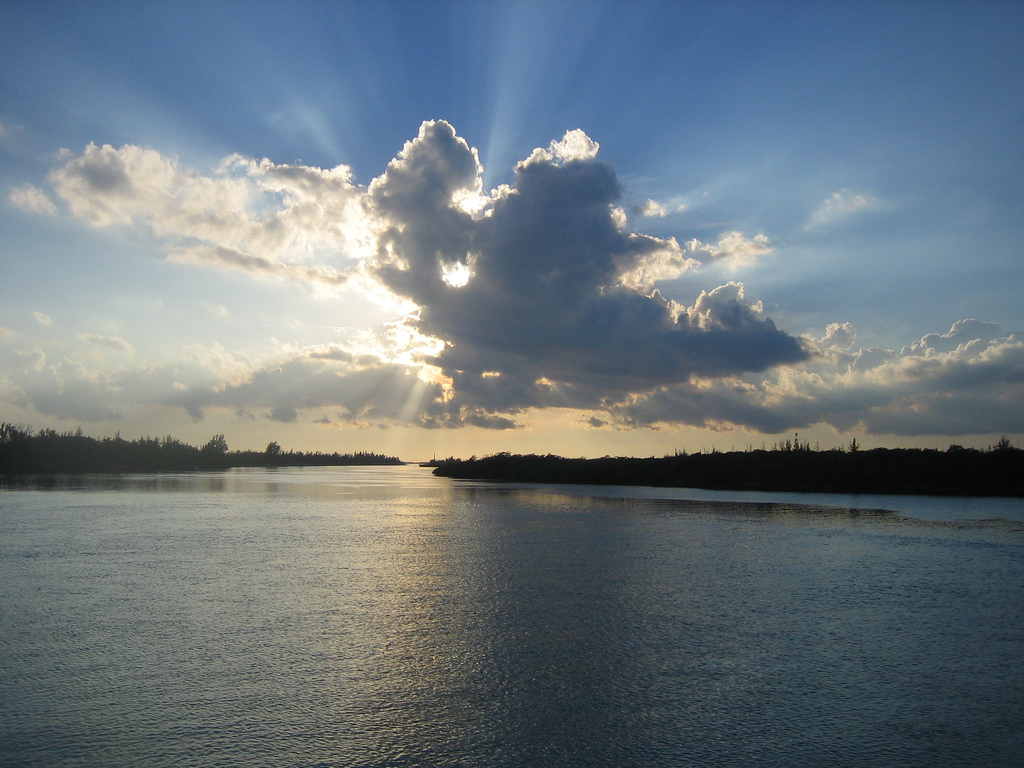
- Sunset over Fresh Creek inlet

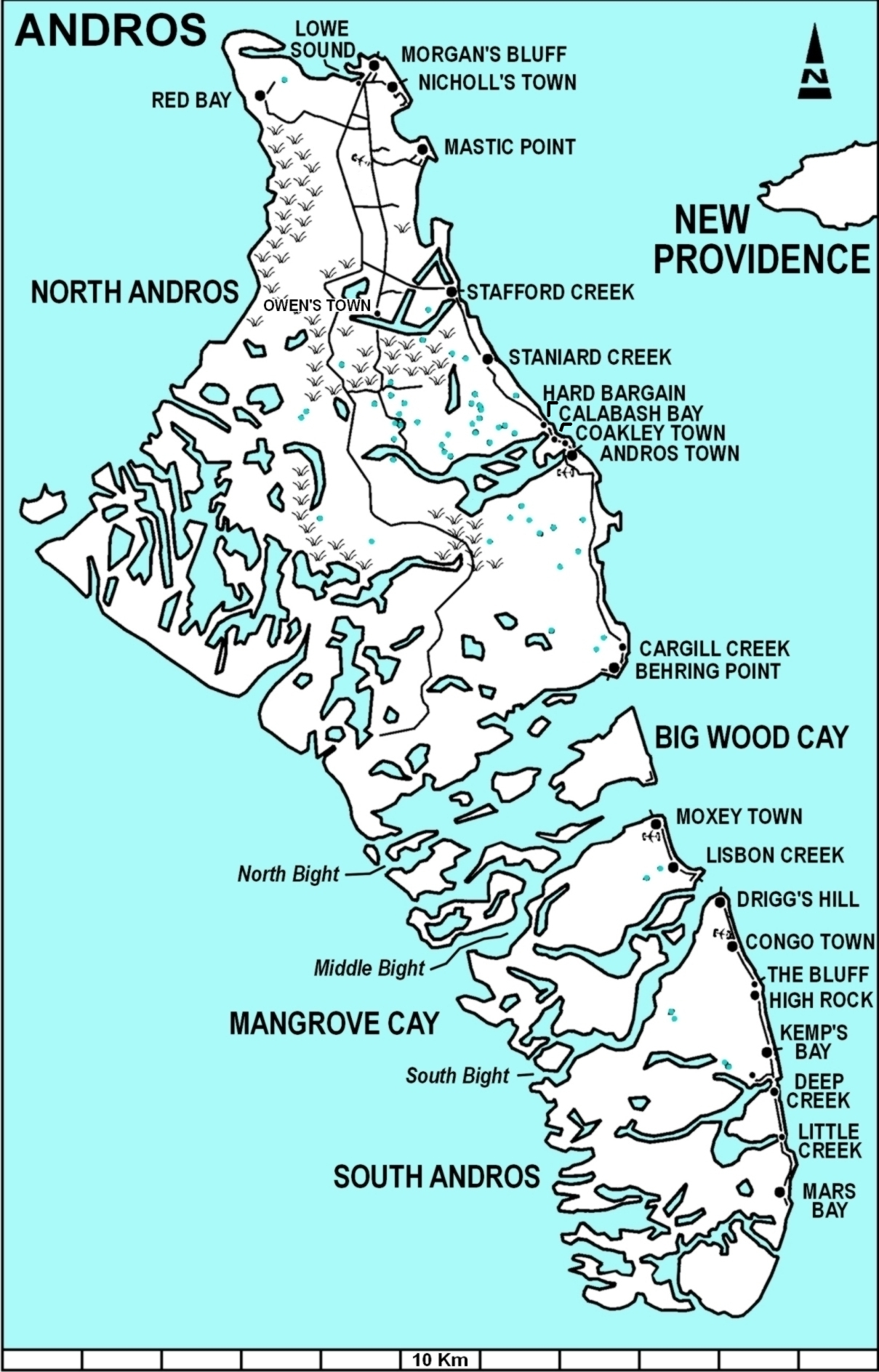
- Fresh Creek District was the central portion of Andros Island

- Location within Bahamas
- Coordinates: 24°35′N 78°00′W
- Country: The Bahamas
- Island: Andros
- disestablished in The Bahamas Local Government Act of 1996: before 1996

Population (2000)
  - Total: 2,576
- Time zone: UTC−5 (EST)
  - Summer (DST): UTC−4 (EDT)
- Area code: 242

Fresh Creek was a district of the Bahamas before 1996. It consisted of the central portion of the island of Andros. The population (1995) was 2,576.

New districts were created on Andros in 1996. Fresh Creek district was roughly replaced by Central Andros.

The area is popular among tourists on angling holidays. One popular form of fishing there is fly fishing for Bonefish.

Fresh Creek is a tidal creek near Coakley Town and Andros Town, North Andros (mouth: 24.7257°N 77.7842°W).
