= Cargill Creek =

Creek in Central Andros, Bahamas

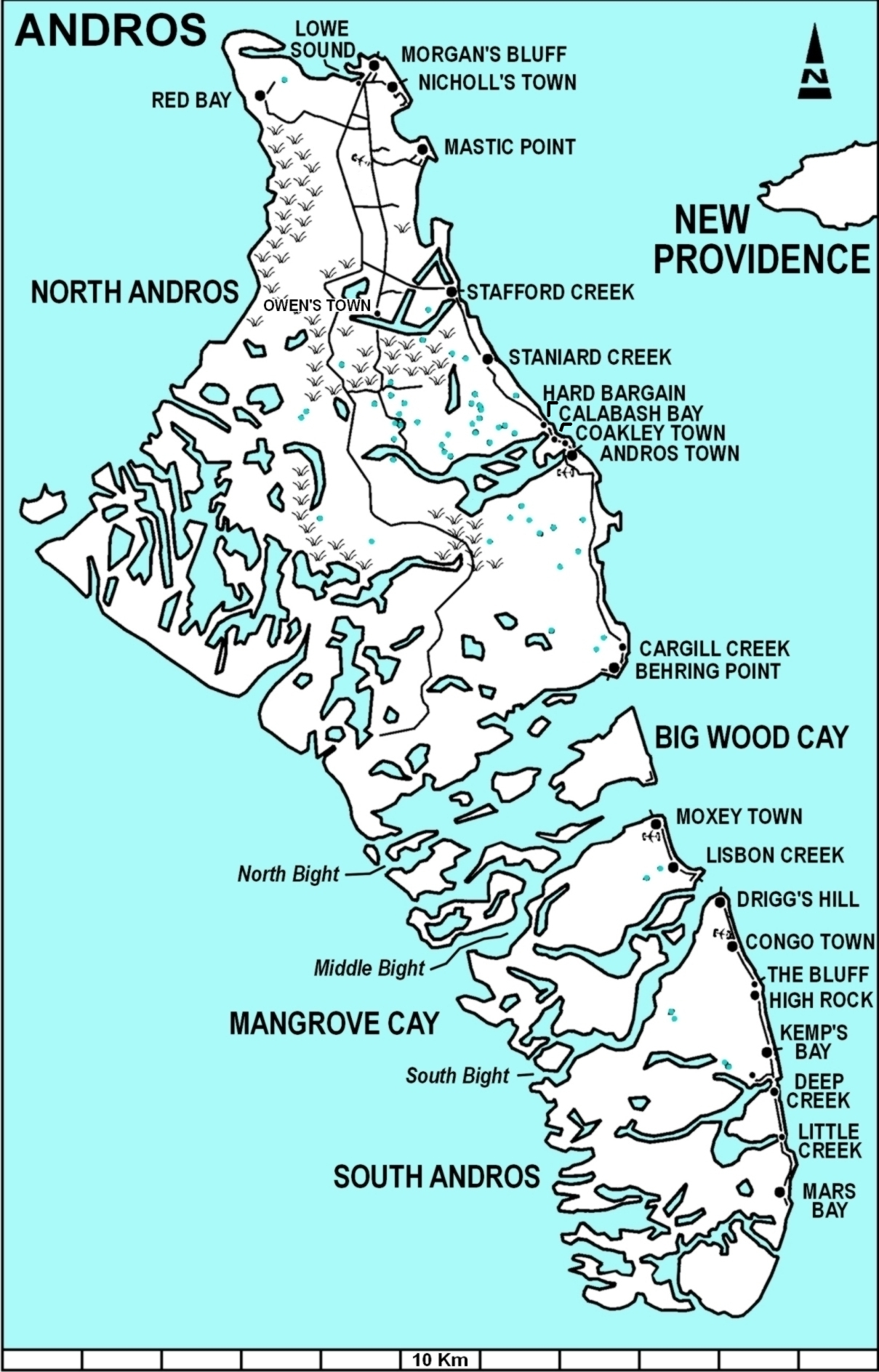

- Location of mouth

Location
- Country: The Bahamas

Physical characteristics
- Mouth
  - location: Cargill Cay, Central Andros
  - coordinates: 24.4834°N 77.72256°W

The Cargill Creek is a tidal creek in Cargill Creek, Central Andros, the Bahamas.

== See also ==
- List of rivers of the Bahamas
