= Hawk Creek (Bahamas) =

- Location of mouth

Location
- Country: The Bahamas

Physical characteristics
- Mouth
  - location: North Andros
  - coordinates: 24°29′N 78°18′W
  - elevation: 0 mi (0 km)

The Hawk Creek is a river in North Andros, the Bahamas.

== See also ==
- List of rivers of the Bahamas
