= Spring City, Bahamas =

Spring City
- Location of Spring City in the Bahamas
- Coordinates: 26°24′N 77°10′W
- Country: Bahamas
- Island: Abaco Islands
- District: Central Abaco
- Elevation: 4 m (13 ft)

Population (2010)
  - Total: 500
- Time zone: UTC-5 (Eastern Time Zone)
- Area code: 242

Spring City is a town in the Abaco Islands, northern Bahamas. It is almost directly south of Marsh Harbour. It is also a part of the Marsh Harbour-Spring City Township. It is located 4 meters above sea-level, making it prone to global warming. As of 2010, its population was 500.

The town is named for a blue hole, which is found near the back of the settlement in the pine forest. During the Wilson city era of logging operations, the railroad passed by the blue hole to fill up on water. Spring city was started in 1959, to house Bahamian staff for the Ownes Illinois pulpwood operation, at Snake Cay. The settlement began to decline after the pulpwood and sugar operations shut down, however it was still home to hundreds of people. During Hurricane Dorian, on September 1st 2019, the town was heavily damaged and most of its residents were displaced. Today, due to rebuilding efforts and resettlement, Spring city has made a comeback.

== See also ==
- Marsh Harbour
- The Bahamas
