= South Andros =

District of The Bahamas

District of South Andros
- Coordinates: 25°4′N 77°20′W
- Country: Bahamas
- Island: Andros
- Established: 1996

Government
  - Type: District Council
  - Chief Councillor: Ashley Brown
  - Deputy Chief Councillor: Bernadette Rolle

Population (2022)
  - Total: 3,711
- Time zone: UTC−5 (EST)
  - Summer (DST): UTC−4 (EDT)
- Area code: 242

South Andros is a district of the nation of the Bahamas.

Geographically, South Andros is the southernmost third of the land mass colloquially called Andros, which includes the districts of North Andros, Central Andros, Mangrove Cay and South Andros. In 2022, the district had 3,711 inhabitants.

== Transportation ==
The districts are divided by broad unspanned "creeks", some of which offer public ferry crossing; otherwise the only way to travel from one district to another is by private plane or boat. South Andros is accessed from Nassau via commercial airline (currently two trips daily from Nassau to South Andros Airport), from the U.S. via two flights commercially from Fort Lauderdale International and other islands by charter airplane (usually from Fort Lauderdale, Florida), and from anywhere by private boat. A public ferry runs daily between South Andros and its northern neighbouring Mangrove Cay which is also considered a part of South Andros. The mail boat comes to Andros once a week from Nassau, leaving Nassau Monday night and arriving at Drigg's Hill port on South Andros on Tuesday morning, which brings the majority of all imports and supplies to the island, from milk to petrol.

=== Roads ===
The Queen's Highway, a two lane paved and illuminated road without traffic lights, runs approximately 60 km (40 mi) from the northernmost edge of South Andros which is the port of Drigg's Hill, to the dockside settlement of Mars Bay. At Mars Bay the road ends in a cul de sac but the island extends approximately 30 km (20 mi) further south without roads or services, inaccessible except by boat. In its course from Drigg's Hill to Mars Bay, the highway crosses two bridges, one at Deep Creek and one further south at Little Creek, both refurbished in 2012.

== Settlements ==
Almost the entire population of South Andros lives in housing abutting the Queen's Highway and a few short, paved roads trailing off it. The only other significant road is that leading west, inland, along the north side of Deep Creek, to Black Point, where there are a handful of additional homes. South Andros' widest point is about 30 km (20 mi) east to west, but only the eastern fringe is inhabited, as most of the island consists of salty marsh and tidal estuaries.

All housing on South Andros consists of small, single family homes, sometimes clustered in small groups on a single tract of land, and almost all buildings are made of cement block and/or local limestone, as wood is expensive to import and does not withstand hurricanes well. Government-provided electric, telephone and rubbish disposal services are available to all homes on the island, with a major power generation plant located mid-island in the settlement called The Bluff or Blufftown. Municipal water is supplied to much of the island inhabitants but for residents in the southern part of the island, water is obtained by catchment or private well: many parts of Andros enjoy an abundance of underground fresh water lenses. Natural gas is purchased by the tank, brought in weekly by mail boat from Nassau.

== Economy ==
South Andros is known for the production of certain seasonal delicacies, fresh conch, land crab, and spiny lobster, in relative abundance, which are sold commercially in Nassau or to the representatives of Nassau food distributors, providing an important source of cash to many inhabitants. The only other current industry of note is tourism. Albeit limited, there is a small upscale ecotourism lodge, a 36-room traditional hotel and as well the management of "bonefish lodges," small hotels which offer all-inclusive packages for tourists wishing to fish the world-famous "bonefish flats" of the southeastern fringe of the island. As of summer 2005, there were 4–6 such lodges in operation, each maintaining 4–12 guest rooms. The very low level of tourist traffic supports few restaurants and almost no shops aside from the necessary basic hardware and grocery stores.

== Notable people ==
- Dame Marguerite Pindling Governor General of The Bahamas and the wife of the late Sir Lynden Pindling
- Picewell Forbes, longtime radio personality and former Member of Parliament for South Andros
- Hon Leon Lundy, present Member of Parliament for South Andros
- Renward Wells, former Member of Parliament for Bamboo Town
- Dr Leon Higgs, former President of the College of the Bahamas
- Garet “Tiger” Finlayson, well-known businessman
- Elliston Rahming, Bahamian diplomat, criminologist, educator and politician

== Politics ==
For elections to the Parliament of the Bahamas, it is part of the Mangrove Cay and South Andros constituency.

== Facilities ==
The majority of South Andros residents are members of either Baptist or Seventh-day Adventist Church congregations, with a few Catholic, Anglican and other denominations represented by a church or two. There are no movie theatres, video rental stores, chain restaurants, major hotels, or major car rental agencies on South Andros; however, Bank of the Bahamas has a branch in Kemp's Bay (ATM & public banking on Wednesdays).
