= Marsh Harbour =

- Town
- Location within Bahamas
- Coordinates: 26°32′32″N 77°03′49″W
- Country: The Bahamas
- Island: Abaco
- District: Central Abaco
- Elevation: 4 m (13 ft)

Population (2012)
  - Total: 6,283
  - Estimate (2018): 5,728
- Time zone: Eastern Time Zone
- Area code: 242
- Website: https://www.bahamas.com/vendor/marsh-harbour

Marsh Harbour is a town in Abaco Islands, Bahamas, with a population of 6,283 as of 2012.

The settlement lies on a peninsula just off the Great Abaco Highway, which runs south through Great Abaco to Cherokee Point and Little Harbour. North of town, the road becomes S.C. Bootle Highway, another smooth stretch that runs north and west toward Treasure Cay and Little Abaco.

Marsh Harbour has the majority of services available in all of the Abacos, including a post office, bookstore, grocery stores, specialty shops, travel agencies, and laundries. Visitors come to boat, swim or snorkel, and stay at one of the lodges located near Bay Street on the waterfront, though some adventurers reserve a day or two to kayak in the Marls on trips conducted by naturalist guides. The Marls are an extensive region of pristine mangrove habitat and open shallows called "flats" that harbour a rich variety of wildlife and offer an important fisheries, for local sustenance and for sport.

In 2019, Marsh Harbour was directly impacted by category 5 Hurricane Dorian, severely damaging most structures and infrastructure in the city.

== Notable events in Marsh Harbour history ==
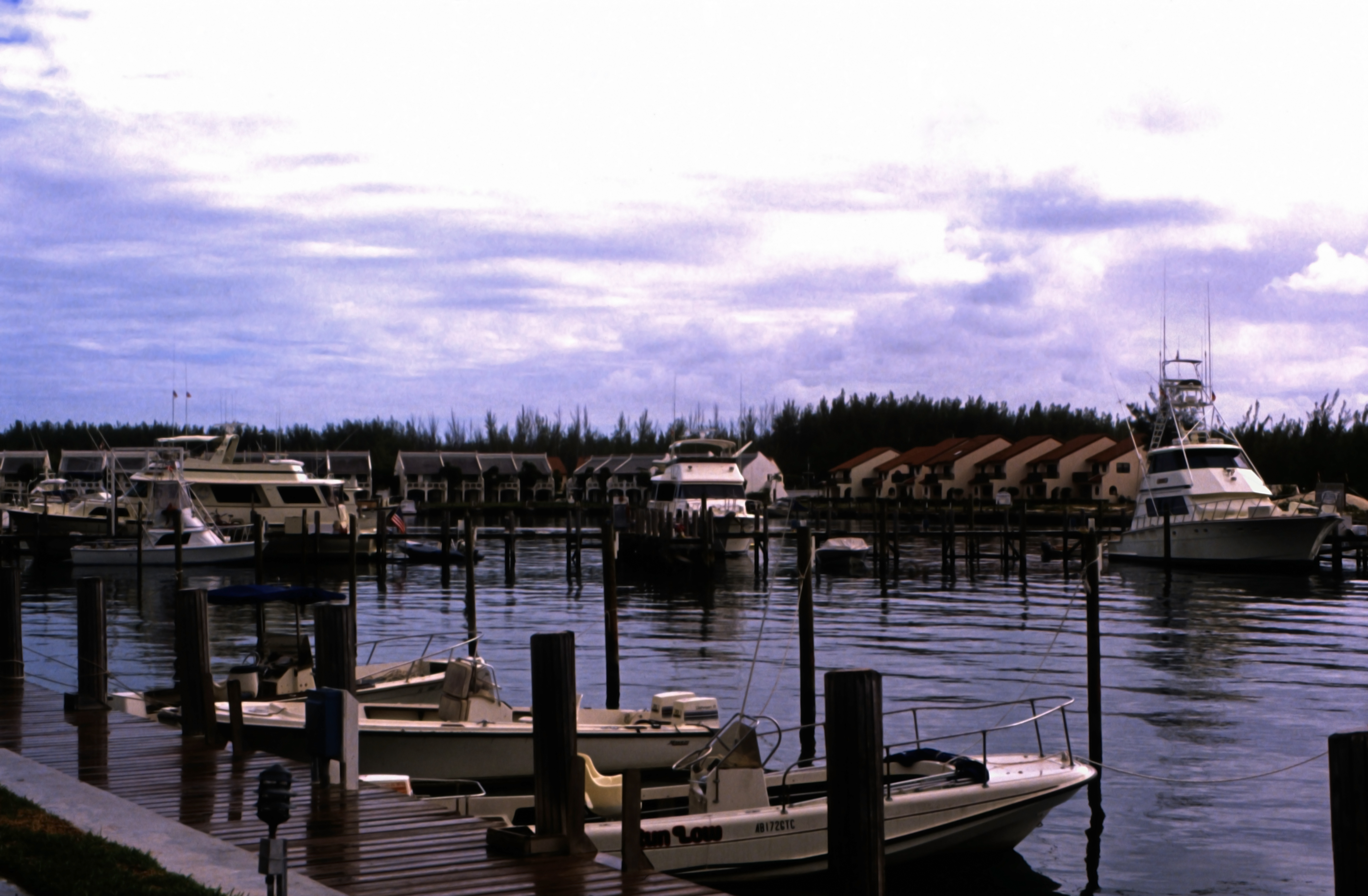
Marsh Harbour in 1989

- On 25 August 2001, American R&B singer Aaliyah was among nine people killed in a plane crash after departing Marsh Harbour Airport after filming the music video for her single "Rock the Boat".
- Rhonda Lea Cornea Hull, Miss Commonwealth Bahamas 1985 is from Marsh Harbour, and she represented The Bahamas at the 1985 Miss World Pageant in London.
- Lolita Armbrister Monpetit, Miss Bahamas 1978 was born in Dundas Town, a settlement next to Marsh Harbour. She represented The Bahamas at the Miss Universe Pageant in 1979 in Perth, Australia.
- On 1 September 2019, Hurricane Dorian, a category 5 hurricane on the Saffir–Simpson scale, made landfall in Marsh Harbour, tying the record with the 1935 Labor Day hurricane for the highest sustained winds at landfall for an Atlantic hurricane.

== See also ==
- Spring City, Abaco
