= Athol Island =

Island in The Bahamas

- Location within Bahamas

Geography
- Location: Atlantic Ocean
- Coordinates: 25°05′N 77°16′W
- Archipelago: Lucayan Archipelago

Administration
- Bahamas

Additional information
- Time zone: EST (UTC-5)
  - Summer (DST): EDT (UTC-4)
- ISO code: BS-NP

Athol Island is a small island in the Bahamas, which lies 0.75 miles (1.21 km) east of Paradise Island, which lies directly off of New Providence island. The island is uninhabited. The island runs 2 miles (3.2 km) west to east. The island is part of the National Marine Park. The nearby waters of the island are often used for snorkeling.
