= San Andros Airport =

Airport in The Bahamas

- IATA: SAQ; ICAO: MYAN

Summary
- Airport type: Public
- Serves: Nicholls Town, Andros Island, Bahamas
- Hub for: Passenger: Western Air
- Elevation AMSL: 5 ft / 2 m
- Coordinates: 25°03′14″N 078°02′56″W

Map
- Location in The Bahamas

Runways
Direction	Length		Surface
Direction	m	ft	Surface
12/30	1,524	5,000	Bitumen
- Source: DAFIF

San Andros Airport (IATA: SAQ, ICAO: MYAN) is an airport near Nicholls Town on Andros Island in The Bahamas.

== Facilities ==
The airport resides at an elevation of 5 ft (1.5 m) above mean sea level. It has one runway designated 12/30 with a bitumen surface measuring 1,524 m × 23 m (5,000 ft × 75 ft).

The airport has services from Western Air, Bahamasair, Lynx (from Fort Lauderdale) and other small twin-engine charter planes that run between the islands.

Since November 2006, the airport has Avgas and Jet A available from Western Air.

== Airlines and destinations ==
Scheduled passenger service from this airport is provided by the following airlines:

Airlines	Destinations
Western Air	Nassau
