= Hawk Creek (Minnesota) =

Coordinates: 44.7360690°N 95.4225136°W

Location
- Country: United States

Physical characteristics
- Source
  - location: Minnesota

Hawk Creek is a 62.0-mile-long (99.8 km) tributary of the Minnesota River in Kandiyohi, Chippewa, and Renville counties, Minnesota, United States. It begins at the outlet of Foot Lake in Willmar and flows southwest, passing the cities of Raymond, Clara City, and Maynard. Turning south, it reaches the Minnesota River 7 miles (11 km) southeast of Granite Falls.

One of Hawk Creek's tributaries is called the Chetamba Creek/River between Maynard, Sacred Heart, and Granite Falls.

"Hawk Creek" is an English translation of the native Sioux language name.

== See also ==
- List of rivers of Minnesota
