= Nicholls Town =

- Town
- Location within Bahamas
- Coordinates: 25°08′29″N 78°00′21″W
- Country: Bahamas
- Island: Andros
- District: North Andros

Population (2010)
  - Total: 645
- Time zone: UTC-5 (Eastern Time Zone)
- Area code: 242

Nicholls Town is a town located in North Andros, part of Andros island in the Bahamas. The town features a sweeping beachfront.

It is named for Edward Nicolls, an Anglo-Irish military leader in the Caribbean in the early 19th century. He was an active abolitionist and because of him many former Afro American slaves were able to escape from the U.S. The founders of Nicholls Town were ex-slave refugees from the United States.

The Andros Island Beach Resort is located in Nicolls Town. The town is the centre for diving and snorkelling in North Andros.

It has a population of 645 (2010 Census). The town is served by San Andros Airport.

== See also ==
- Districts of the Bahamas
- Islands of the Bahamas
- List of cities in the Bahamas
