= Central Abaco =

District in the Bahamas

Coordinates: 26°26′N 77°08′W

The Location of the District of Central Abaco

Central Abaco is an administrative district of the Bahamas. It is part of the larger Abaco Islands chain and is the largest Schedule 2 district in the Bahamas. In 2004, it had a population of 6,014 inhabitants.

The district includes the towns of:

- Marsh Harbour - the largest town and the commerce centre of the Abacos
- Murphy Town
- Dundas Town.

Some of the more notable settlements in Central Abaco include:

- Little Harbour
- Lake City
- Spring City.

The local government for this district is based in Marsh Harbour.

Industry in Central Abaco has included farming of vegetables and fruit for export, pulpwood and sugarcane operations despite challenges from alkalinity and salt intrusion.

Central Abaco was hard hit by Hurricane Dorian in 2019.

== Administrators ==
- Everette Hart (c.1998)
