= Mangrove Cay =

Island in The Bahamas

Coordinates: 24°10′N 77°47′W

Location of the district of Mangrove Cay

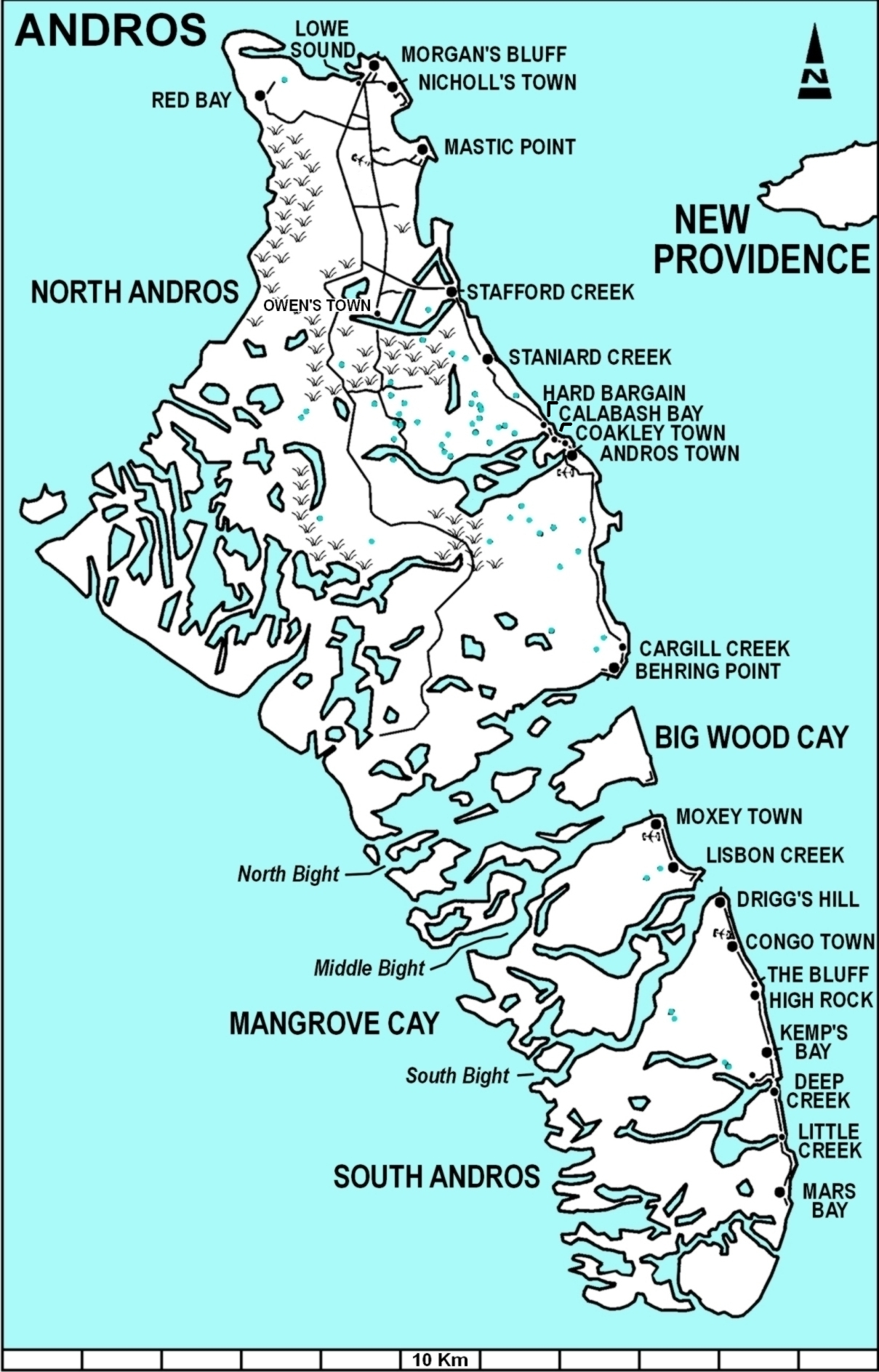
Andros, with Mangrove Cay

Mangrove Cay is one of the districts of the Bahamas on Andros. The capital of Mangrove Cay is Moxey Town in the northeast corner of the island.

There are 3 schools: Victoria Point Preschool, Burnt Rock Primary, and Mangrove Cay High School.

The census of population 2010-05-03 shows a population of 892 for the district, of which 420 were in Moxey Town (Little Harbour).

Sponging is a major economy in the district.

== Politics ==
For elections to the Parliament of the Bahamas, the district is part of the Mangrove Cay and South Andros constituency.
