= Central Andros =

District in the Bahamas

District of Central Andros Central Andros
- Location of the District of Central Andros
- Coordinates: 24°46′01″N 78°05′46″W
- Country: Bahamas
- Island: Andros
- Established: 1996

Government
  - Type: District Council
  - Chief Councillor: Deon Sweeting

Population (2010)
  - Total: 662
- Time zone: UTC−5 (EST)
  - Summer (DST): UTC−4 (EDT)
- Area code: 242

Central Andros is one of the districts of the Bahamas, on Andros Island. Its current Chief Councillor is Ms. Natasha Scott. The Member of Parliament for this District is Minister Leon Lundy.

Central Andros is known for its large concentration of blue holes and wide area of bone fishing flats. On a global scale, this particular area is a well known eco-tourism destination.
