= North Andros =

District of The Bahamas

District of North Andros North Andros
- Coordinates: 24°46′01″N 78°05′46″W
- Country: Bahamas
- Island: Andros
- Established: 1996

Government
  - Type: District Council
  - Chief Councillor: Brian O’Neal Cleare
  - Deputy Chief Councillor: Granville Coleby

Population (2022)
  - Total: 4,069
- Time zone: UTC−5 (EST)
  - Summer (DST): UTC−4 (EDT)
- Area code: 242

North Andros is one of the 31 districts of the Bahamas. It is also the largest district (in area) in the country, and has some of the largest settlements in Andros Island. The population (2022 Census) is 4,069. "North Andros" is also the name of a physical island that is larger than the district, one of the three islands of the "Andros Island" group along with Mangrove Cay and South Andros.

== Churches ==
There are a number of church denominations represented within Andros. In North Andros, the Anglican Episcopal Church has a presence through St. Margaret's Parish. This parish consists of two churches: St. Margaret's, located in the settlement of Nicholl's Town, the oldest church in North Andros, built in 1838; and St. Mary Magdalene, located in the settlement of Mastic Point and built in 1849. There are two denominations of Methodist Churches. (MCCA) Wesley Methodist church is located in Mastic Point, while Wesley Mt. Zion is in Nicholls Town. (BCMC) Wesley Methodist is located at Mastic Point. There is also the Church of God of Prophecy. Branches may be found in Lowe Sound, Mastic Point, Staniard Creek, and Conch Sound, the latter having the most members. The Church of God of Prophecy in Conch Sound is home to the "Rushin" Bahamian Culture that is held on a yearly basis around New Year's time.

== Settlements ==
Prevalent settlements in North Andros are:

- Red Bays
- Morgan's Bluff
- Lowe Sound
- Nicholls Town
- Conch Sound
- San Andros
- Mastic Point
- Stafford Creek
- Blanket Sound
- Staniard Creek
- Love Hill

== Politics ==
For elections to the Parliament of the Bahamas, the district was part of the North Andros and Berry Islands constituency until 2026. From 2026, the district will be covered by the North Andros constituency.

== External ==
- St Margaret's Anglican Episcopal Church in North Andros
