= Tidal creek =

Inlet or estuary that is affected by ebb and flow of ocean tides

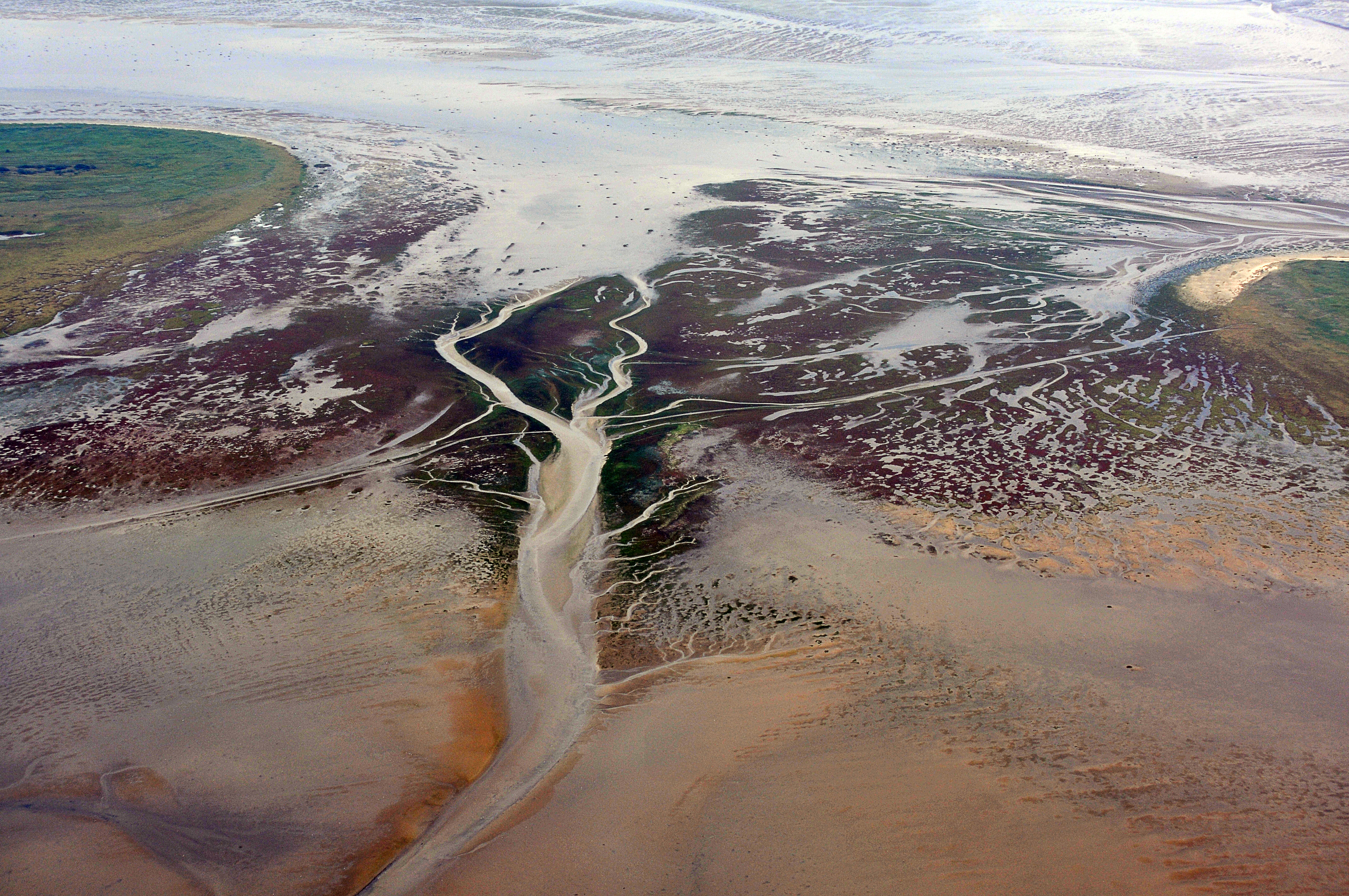
Aerial photo of North Sea, tidal channels between the islands of Nigehörn (left) and Scharhörn (right)

A tidal creek or tidal channel is a narrow inlet or estuary that is affected by the ebb and flow of ocean tides. Thus, it has variable salinity and electrical conductivity over the tidal cycle, and flushes salts from inland soils. Tidal creeks are characterized by slow water velocity, resulting in buildup of fine, organic sediment in wetlands. Creeks may often be a dry to muddy channel with little or no flow at low tide, but with significant depth of water at high tide. Due to the temporal variability of water quality parameters within the tidally influenced zone, there are unique biota associated with tidal creeks which are often specialised to such zones. Nutrients and organic matter are delivered downstream to habitats normally lacking these, while the creeks also provide access to inland habitat for salt-water organisms.

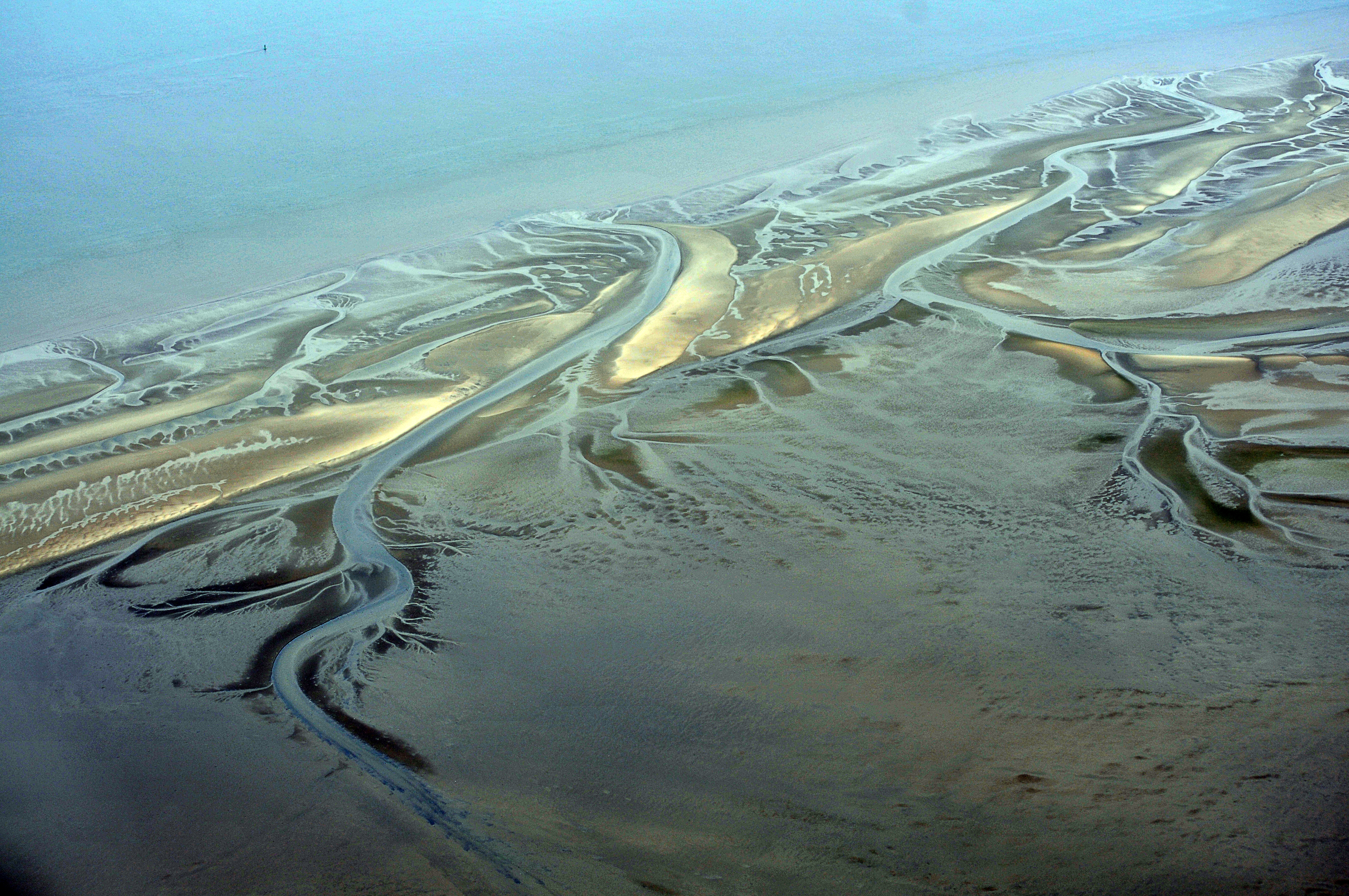
Aerial photo of North Sea, tidal inlets from the Wadden Sea on Scharhörn

== Terminology ==
A "creek" normally refers to a tidal water channel in British English and in other parts of the Anglosphere. This is the case in many countries in the Commonwealth, such as The Bahamas, as well as some parts of the United States (near the Chesapeake Bay, parts of New England, and southern Florida (Note: "Creek" is used in the names of tidal creeks on the Florida mainland such as Snapper Creek, Arch Creek and Frog Creek and in the Florida Keys in the names of tidal channels such as Jewfish Creek, Snake Creek and Caesar Creek.)). In the tidal section of the River Thames in London, the names of the rivers that flow into it all become Creeks for the lower section that is tidal; thus, for example, the River Lea becomes Bow Creek in its tidal section. In parts of southwest England and Wales, the term "pill" is used, and is found in placenames such as Huntspill.

A narrow channel between islands in the Florida Keys is known there as a creek. On the India and Pakistan borders, the term also applies to the salt water inlets enclosed by mangroves. Creeks are found dispersed all along the Indian coast.

A "tidal course" is the more general term for any elongated indentation or valley in a wetland originated by tidal processes along which water flows pumped by tidal influence. It includes a series of indentations within a wide spectrum of sizes (width, length, and depth) and with at least two levels of inundation. Subtypes are tidal rills, tidal grooves, tidal gullies, that normally do not contain water even during neap low tide, and tidal creeks and tidal channels, that have water permanently. A tidal course creates a system for its ecosystem that circulates water, sediments, organic matter, nutrient, and pollutants. A tidal course is essential to the surrounding flora and fauna because they provide protection, nutrients, a place to reproduce, and a habitat for juvenile species before they go into the ocean.

== Development ==
Whereas areas of coastline that experience high wave activity are usually characterized by beaches, areas sheltered from wave action may develop tidal wetland systems. In these areas, upland creeks drain towards the shore, draining the high part of the coast. At some point they become tidal, technically estuarine.

As they come closer to shore, they often become very sinuous, due to the flatness of the land. In addition to draining upland fresh water (in many instances) tidal creeks form by the ebb tide seaward flow and downward incision of the water as it flows from inland to the shore. At high tide and spring tide, large areas are covered with water. This huge volume of water retreats at the start of the ebb tide in a surge. Later on during the ebb tide, water remains only in the creeks and the current is mainly a river (drainage) current and not tidal. Tidal creeks deposit sediment in a process called accretion, during the flood tide, which can maintain a flat plain by counteracting sea level rise or land subsidence. High tidal flow will maintain channels, while slower flow velocity can lead to closure of tidal creeks as they become clogged with sediment. Well-developed wetlands have sharp-banked tidal creeks, with vegetation stabilizing the sides of the creeks. Such tidal creeks will also be connected in networks: a multitude of smaller creeks called first-order creeks will feed into large ones, creating complex patterns of drainage.

== Human impact ==
Especially in areas prone to compaction or subsidence - like peat wetlands - human use of tidal creek flow can lead to the expansion of the creeks. Natural subsidence is compounded by anthropogenic sediment compaction, lowering the land level. Deforestation and other human-development-related processes can destabilize the banks of creeks and increase the amount of sediment in them. This slows the velocity of the water, which means that instead of cutting deeper channels, the water flows gently farther inland in shallow channels. Human development in tidal areas often results in diking, which changes the course of the tidal creeks and the salinity of the tidal area into freshwater.

Restoration of tidal wetlands begins with restoration of the creek systems, which determine the shape of the land, the nutrient and salinity levels, and the type of vegetation and animal communities in a wetland.

== Examples ==
There are thousands of examples of tidal creeks throughout the world. A few specific ones are:

- Burn of Ayreland, Mainland, Orkney, Scotland
- Americano Creek, California, US
- Crooked River, Florida, US
- Ennore Creek, Chennai, India
- Thane Creek, Mumbai Metropolitan Region, Maharashtra, India
- Gorai Creek, Mumbai, Maharashtra, India
- Vasai Creek, Thane, Maharashtra, India
- Dubai Creek, United Arab Emirates
- Wootton Creek, Isle of Wight, England

== See also ==
- River delta
- Salt marsh
