= Index of the Bahamas–related articles =

The location of the Commonwealth of The Bahamas

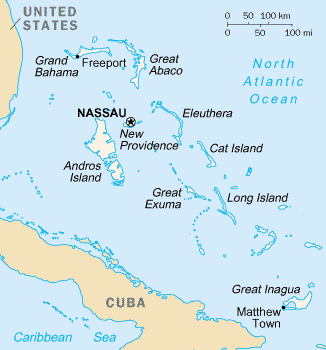
A map of The Bahamas

The following is an alphabetical list of topics related to the Commonwealth of The Bahamas.

== 0–9 ==
- .bs – Internet country code top-level domain for the Bahamas
- 1926 Miami Hurricane
- 1928 Okeechobee Hurricane
- 1929 Bahamas hurricane
- 1932 Bahamas hurricane
- 1947 Fort Lauderdale Hurricane
- 2014 Bahamas Bowl
- 2015 Bahamas Bowl
- 2016 Bahamas Bowl
- 2017 Commonwealth Youth Games
- 2017 in The Bahamas

== A ==
- Aaron Cleare
- Abaco Air
- Abaco Independence Movement
- Abaco Islands
- Abraham's Bay
- Acklins
- Acklins and Crooked Islands
- Afro-Bahamian
- Agriculture in the Bahamas
- Airports in the Bahamas
- Alex Smith, son of Ed Smith
- Alice Town
- Ambergris Cay
- Americas
  - North America
    - Northern America
      - North Atlantic Ocean
        - West Indies
          - Lucayan Archipelago
            - Bahama Islands
- Andrae Williams
- Andros, Bahamas
- Andros Central Airport
- Andros Conservancy & Trust Bahamas
- Andros Town
- Andros Town International Airport
- Anna Cay
- Arawak Cay
- Ardastra Gardens, Zoo and Conservation Centre
- Area code 242
- Arthur Dion Hanna
- Arthur Foulkes
- Arthur Hailey
- Arthur's Town
- Arthur's Town Airport
- Athletics at the 2017 Commonwealth Youth Games
- Athol Island
- Atlantis Paradise Island
- Atlas of the Bahamas
- Autec Heliport
- Avard Moncur

== B ==
- Baha Mar
- Baha Men
- Bahama Banks
- Bahama Islands
- Bahamas (magazine)
- The Bahamas
- Bahamasair
- Bahamas Airline Pilots Association
- Bahamas and the American Civil War
- Bahamas Association of Athletic Associations
- Bahamas at the 1958 British Empire and Commonwealth Games
- Bahamas at the 1962 British Empire and Commonwealth Games
- Bahamas at the 2010 Central American and Caribbean Games
- Bahamas at the Commonwealth Games
- Bahamas at the 2002 Commonwealth Games
- Bahamas at the 2006 Commonwealth Games
- Bahamas at the 2014 Commonwealth Games
- Bahamas at the Olympics
- Bahamas at the 1952 Summer Olympics
- Bahamas at the 1956 Summer Olympics
- Bahamas at the 1960 Summer Olympics
- Bahamas at the 1964 Summer Olympics
- Bahamas at the 1968 Summer Olympics
- Bahamas at the 1972 Summer Olympics
- Bahamas at the 1976 Summer Olympics
- Bahamas at the 1984 Summer Olympics
- Bahamas at the 1988 Summer Olympics
- Bahamas at the 1992 Summer Olympics
- Bahamas at the 1996 Summer Olympics
- Bahamas at the 2000 Summer Olympics
- Bahamas at the 2004 Summer Olympics
- Bahamas at the 2008 Summer Olympics
- Bahamas at the 2012 Summer Olympics
- Bahamas at the 2016 Summer Olympics
- Bahamas at the 1972 Summer Paralympics
- Bahamas at the 1976 Summer Paralympics
- Bahamas at the 1980 Summer Paralympics
- Bahamas at the 2010 Summer Youth Olympics
- Bahamas at the 2014 Summer Youth Olympics
- Bahamas at the Pan American Games
- Bahamas at the 1979 Pan American Games
- Bahamas at the 1983 Pan American Games
- Bahamas at the 1987 Pan American Games
- Bahamas at the 1991 Pan American Games
- Bahamas at the 1995 Pan American Games
- Bahamas at the 1999 Pan American Games
- Bahamas at the 2003 Pan American Games
- Bahamas at the 2007 Pan American Games
- Bahamas at the 2011 Pan American Games
- Bahamas at the 2015 Pan American Games
- Bahamas at the Paralympics
- Bahamas at the 1984 Summer Paralympics
- Bahamas at the 1988 Summer Paralympics
- Bahamas at the 2011 World Aquatics Championships
- Bahamas at the 2013 World Aquatics Championships
- Bahamas at the 2015 World Aquatics Championships
- Bahamas at the 2017 World Aquatics Championships
- Bahamas at the World Championships in Athletics
- Bahamas at the 2009 World Championships in Athletics
- Bahamas at the 2011 World Championships in Athletics
- Bahamas at the 2013 World Championships in Athletics
- Bahamas at the 2015 World Championships in Athletics
- Bahamas at the 2017 World Championships in Athletics
- Bahamas Bowl
- Bahamas–China relations
- Bahamas Cricket Association
- Bahamas Crisis Centre
- Bahamas–Cuba relations
- Bahamas Customs Service
- Bahamas Democratic Movement
- Bahamas Davis Cup team
- Bahamas Electricity Corporation
- Bahamas Fed Cup team
- Bahamas Football Association
- Bahamas Hotel, Catering and Allied Workers Union
- Bahamas Institute of Chartered Accountants
- Bahamas International
- Bahamas International Film Festival
- Bahamas Maritime Authority
- Bahamas men's national softball team
- Bahamas Ministry of Tourism
- Bahamas national baseball team
- Bahamas national basketball team
- Bahamas national beach soccer team
- Bahamas national cricket team
- Bahamas national football team
- Bahamas national football team results
- Bahamas National Open
- Bahamas national rugby sevens team
- Bahamas national rugby union team
- Bahamas National Trust
- Bahamas national under-17 basketball team
- Bahamas national under-19 basketball team
- Bahamas Olympic Committee
- Bahamas President's Cup
- Bahamas Reef Environmental Educational Foundation
- Bahamas Securities Exchange
- Bahamas Speed Week
- Bahamas Taxi Cab Union
- Bahamasair
- Bahamas-Nantucket Hurricane of 1932
- Bahamian Americans
- Bahamian constitutional referendum, 2016
- Bahamian Creole
- Bahamian cuisine
- Bahamian Democratic Party
- Bahamian diplomatic missions
- Bahamian dollar
- Bahamian English
- Bahamian gambling referendum, 2013
- Bahamian general election, 1833
- Bahamian general election, 1935
- Bahamian general election, 1949
- Bahamian general election, 1956
- Bahamian general election, 1962
- Bahamian general election, 1967
- Bahamian general election, 1968
- Bahamian general election, 1972
- Bahamian general election, 1982
- Bahamian general election, 1977
- Bahamian general election, 1987
- Bahamian general election, 1992
- Bahamian general election, 1997
- Bahamian general election, 2002
- Bahamian general election, 2007
- Bahamian general election, 2012
- Bahamian general election, 2017
- Bahamian passport
- Bahamian pound
- Bahamians
- Bahamian Rhyming Spiritual
- Baker's Bay Golf & Ocean Club
- Banknotes of the Bank of Nassau (Bahamas)
- BaTelCo (Bahamas)
- Battle of Nassau
- Bears FC
- Berry Islands
- BFA Senior League
- Bibliography of the Bahamas
- Big Whale Cay Airport
- Bimini
- Bimini Road
- Bishop of Nassau and The Bahamas
- Black Point
- Black Point Airport
- Blue Lagoon Island
- Brent Symonette
- British Colonial Hilton Nassau
- BTC (Bahamas)

== C ==
- Cabinet of the Bahamas
- Cape Eleuthera Airport
- Cape Santa Maria Airport
- Capital of the Bahamas: Nassau on New Providence
- Capital punishment in the Bahamas
- Capture of the Bahamas (1782)
- Capture of the Bahamas (1783)
- Cargill Creek
- Caribbean
- Caribbean Community (CARICOM)
- Castaway Cay
- Castaway Cay Airport
- Castle Bank & Trust (Bahamas)
- Cat Cays
- Cat Cays Airport
- Cat Island (Bahamas)
- Categories:
  - Category:The Bahamas
    - Category:Bahamas stubs
    - Category:Bahamas-related lists
    - Category:Bahamian people
    - Category:Buildings and structures in the Bahamas
    - Category:Communications in the Bahamas
    - Category:Culture of the Bahamas
    - Category:Economy of the Bahamas
    - Category:Education in the Bahamas
    - Category:Environment of the Bahamas
    - Category:Geography of the Bahamas
    - Category:Government of the Bahamas
    - Category:Health in the Bahamas
    - Category:History of the Bahamas
    - Category:Military of the Bahamas
    - Category:Politics of the Bahamas
    - Category:Science and technology in the Bahamas
    - Category:Society of the Bahamas
    - Category:Sport in the Bahamas
    - Category:Transport in the Bahamas
  - commons:Category:Bahamas
- Catholic Church in the Bahamas
- Cavalier FC
- Cay Sal
- Cay Sal Airport
- Cay Sal Bank
- Central Abaco
- Central Andros
- Central Bank of The Bahamas
- Central Eleuthera
- Chandra Sturrup
- Chief Councillor
- Chief Justice of the Bahamas
- Chris Brown (athlete)
- Christine Amertil
- Chub Cay
- Chub Cay International Airport
- Cistern Field
- Cities in the Bahamas
- Clarence A. Bain Airport
- Clarence Town
- Clifford Darling
- Coakley Cay
- Coat of arms of the Bahamas
- College of the Bahamas
- Colonel Hill
- Colonial Heads of the Bahamas
- Commando Squadron (Bahamas)
- Commonwealth Labour Party (Bahamas)
- Commonwealth of Nations
- Commonwealth of the Bahamas
- Commonwealth of the Bahamas Trade Union Congress
- Commonwealth realm of the Bahamas
- Communications in the Bahamas
- Companies of the Bahamas
- Compass Point Studios
- Conception Island, Bahamas
- Conception Island National Park
- Conch (people)
- Congo Town
- R.E. Cooper, Sr. (Baptist Clergy and Civil Rights Activist)
- Coopers Town
- Cornishtown
- COVID-19 pandemic in the Bahamas
- Craig Hepburn
- Cricket in the Bahamas
- Crooked Island (Bahamas)
- Crown Haven
- Culture of the Bahamas
- Cutlass Bay Airport

== D ==
- Darby Island Airport
- Deadman's Cay Airport
- Dean's Blue Hole
- Debbie Ferguson
- Deep Creek (Bahamas)
- Deep Water Cay Airport
- Democratic National Alliance (Bahamas)
- Demographics of the Bahamas
- Dennis Darling
- Devard Darling
- Diocese of The Bahamas and the Turks and Caicos Islands
- Districts of the Bahamas
- Dolly's Cay
- Dominic Demeritte
- Dolphin Encounters
- Drug Enforcement Unit
- Duncan Town Airport
- Dunmore Town

== E ==
- East Grand Bahama
- Economy of the Bahamas
- Ed Smith, first Bahamian to play in the NFL
- Education in the Bahamas
- Effects of Hurricane Andrew in The Bahamas
- Effects of Hurricane Wilma in The Bahamas
- Egg Island (Bahamas)
- Elbow Cay
- Elbow Cays
- Eldece Clarke-Lewis
- Elections in the Bahamas
- Eleuthera
- Eleutheran Adventurers
- Embassy of the Bahamas in Washington, D.C.
- English colonization of the Americas
- English language
- Eric Gibson
- Exuma
- Exuma Cays Land and Sea Park
- Exuma International Airport

== F ==
The Flag of the Bahamas

- Farmers Cay Airport
- Garet 'Tiger' Finlayson
- Flag of the Bahamas
- Football in the Bahamas
- Foreign relations of the Bahamas
- Fort Charlotte (Nassau)
- Fort Fincastle
- Fowl Cay Airport
- Frank Rutherford
- Free National Movement
- Freeport F.C.
- Freeport Jet Wash Jets
- Freeport, Bahamas
- Freetown, Bahamas
- Fresh Creek
- Friends of the Environment

== G ==
- Gary White (footballer)
- Geography of the Bahamas
- George Town Airport
- God Bless our Sunny Clime
- Goombay Punch
- Goose River (Bahamas)
- Government House, The Bahamas
- Governor-General of the Bahamas
- Governor's Harbour Airport
- Grand Bahama Football League
- Grand Bahama Aux AF Airport
- Grand Bahama International Airport
- Grand Bahama Stadium
- Grand Bahama
- Grand Cay
- Great Guana Cay
- Great Harbour Cay
- Great Harbour Cay Airport
- Great Isaac Cay, Bahamas
- Great Stirrup Cay
- Greek Bahamians
- Green Turtle Cay
- Grotto Beach Formation
- Guanahani
- Gun Cay

== H ==
- Harbour Island
- Hard Bargain Airport
- Hawk Creek (Bahamas)
- Hawks Nest Airport
- Heads of Government of the Bahamas
- Buddy Hield
- High Commission of The Bahamas, London
- High Rock
- History of the Bahamas
- Hog Cay Airport
- Hogsty Reef
- Hope Town
- Hubert Ingraham
- Human trafficking in the Bahamas
- Hunter, Grand Bahama
- Hurricane Andrew
- Hurricane Betsy (1956)
- Hurricane Betsy
- Hurricane David
- Hurricane Dorian
- Hurricane Gracie
- Hurricane Hortense
- Hurricane Inez
- Hurricane Joaquin
- Hurricane Lili (1996)

== I ==
- Illegal drug trade in the Bahamas
- Inagua
- Inagua Airport
- Inagua National Park
- International Organization for Standardization (ISO)
  - ISO 3166-1 alpha-2 country code for the Bahamas: BS
  - ISO 3166-1 alpha-3 country code for the Bahamas: BHS
  - ISO 3166-2:BS region codes for the Bahamas
- Iron Cay
- Islands of the Bahamas
- Ivy Dumont

== J ==
- Jewfish Cay
- Joe Lewis (British businessman)
- Joseph Spence
- Joulter Cays
- Judiciary of the Bahamas
- Junkanoo
- Jwycesska Island
- Kemps Bay

== L ==
- Labour Party (Bahamas)
- Laker Airways (Bahamas)
- Laverne Eve
- Law of the Bahamas
- Leaf Cay Airport
- Lee Stocking Airport
- Leevan Sands
- LGBT rights in the Bahamas (Gay rights)
- Lisbon Creek
- Lists related to the Bahamas:
  - List of airlines of the Bahamas
  - List of airports in the Bahamas
  - List of Bahamas-related topics
  - List of Bahamian flags
  - List of Bahamian musicians
  - List of Bahamians
  - List of birds of the Bahamas
  - List of cathedrals in the Bahamas
  - List of cities in the Bahamas
  - List of companies of the Bahamas
  - List of defunct airlines of the Bahamas
  - List of diplomatic missions in The Bahamas
  - List of flag bearers for the Bahamas at the Olympics
  - List of football clubs in Bahamas
  - List of governors of the Bahamas
  - List of governors-general of the Bahamas
  - List of heads of state of the Bahamas
  - List of hospitals in Bahamas
  - List of islands of the Bahamas
  - List of islands of the Bahamas by total area
  - List of lighthouses in the Bahamas
  - List of mammals of the Bahamas
  - List of museums in the Bahamas
  - List of newspapers in the Bahamas
  - List of people on the postage stamps of the Bahamas
  - List of political parties in the Bahamas
  - List of presidents of the Senate of the Bahamas
  - List of rivers of the Bahamas
  - List of speakers of the House of Assembly of the Bahamas
  - List of television stations in the Bahamas by call sign
  - List of universities in the Bahamas
  - Topic outline of the Bahamas
- Little Darby Island Airport
- Little Grassy Creek
- Little Inagua
- Little San Salvador Island
- Little Stirrup Cay
- Little Whale Cay
- Local government in the Bahamas
- Loggerhead Creek
- Long Cay
- Long Island, Bahamas
- Lookout Cay at Lighthouse Point
- Lt. Whale Cay Airport
- Lucaya, Bahamas
- Lucayan Archipelago
- Lucayan people
- Lyford Cay
- Lyford Cay FC
- Lynden Pindling International Airport

== M ==
- Mack Town
- Man Island (Bahamas)
- Mangrove Cay
- Man-O-War Cay
- March On, Bahamaland
- Mark Knowles
- Marsh Harbour
- Marsh Harbour Airport
- Mary Star of the Sea Church, Freeport
- Matthew Town
- Mayaguana
- Mayaguana Airport
- Military of the Bahamas
- Milo Butler
- Minister of Foreign Affairs (Bahamas)
- Ministry of Foreign Affairs (Bahamas)
- Ministry of Health and Social Development (Bahamas)
- Ministry of National Security (Bahamas)
- Ministry of Public Works and Transport (Bahamas)
- Miss Teen USA
- Mister Bahamas
- Monarchy of the Bahamas
- Mores Island Airport
- Moore's Island
- Mouchoir Bank
- Mount Alvernia
- Mount Creek
- Musha Cay
- Music of The Bahamas (docu-musical)
- Music of the Bahamas

== N ==
- Nassau on New Providence – Capital of the Bahamas
  - Template:Nassau TV
- Nassau Hurricane of 1926
- Nassau Public Library
- Nassau Stadium
- Nathaniel McKinney
- National Art Gallery of The Bahamas
- National Congress of Trade Unions
- National Development Party (Bahamas)
- New Bight Airport
- New Providence
- New Providence Airport
- New Providence Football League
- Nicholls Town
- Nichollstown and Berry Islands
- Norman's Cay
- Norman's Cay Airport
- North Abaco
- North America
- North Andros
- North Atlantic Ocean
- North Bimini Airport
- North Eleuthera
- North Eleuthera Airport
- North Temperate Zone and Tropics
- Northern America
- Northern Hemisphere

== O ==
- O'Brien Cay
- Ocean Cay Airport
- Official Gazette The Bahamas
- Old Fort of Nassau
- Order of Merit of the Bahamas
- Orville Alton Turnquest
- Out Islands

== P ==
- Paradise Island
- Parliament of the Bahamas
- Pauline Davis-Thompson
- Pelican Creek
- Perry Christie
- Pig Beach
- Sir Lynden Oscar Pindling
- Pineapple Air
- Pitts Town Airport
- Plana Cays
- Pledge of Allegiance (Bahamas)
- Politics of the Bahamas
- Port Nelson Airport
- Postage stamps and postal history of the Bahamas
- President of the Court of Appeal of the Bahamas
- Prime Minister of the Bahamas
- Princess Cays
- Progressive Liberal Party
- Public holidays in the Bahamas

== Q ==
- Queen's College, Nassau
- Queen’s Staircase - Nassau

== R ==
- Ragged Island
- Raid on Charles Town
- Raid on Nassau
- Rainbow Alliance of The Bahamas
- Rake-and-scrape
- Religion in the Bahamas
- Republic of Pirates
- Resorts World Bimini
- Rick Fox
- Ripsaw music
- River Lees
- Robert Sweeting (politician)
- Rock Sound, Bahamas
- Rock Sound International Airport
- Roger Smith (tennis player)
- Roland Theodore Symonette
- Roman Catholic Archdiocese of Nassau
- Roscow A. L. Davies Soccer Field
- Rose Island, Bahamas
- Royal Bahamas Defence Force
- Royal Bahamas Police Force
- Rudder Cut Cay Airport
- Rugby union in the Bahamas
- Rum Cay

== S ==
- Steam Locomotive, No.45596 "Bahamas" LMS Jubilee Class
- Samana Cay
- Sampson Cay Airport
- San Andros Airport
- San Salvador Island
- San Salvador and Rum Cay
- San Salvador Island
- Sandy Creek (Bahamas)
- Sandy Point, Bahamas
- Sandy Point Airport
- Sapodilla Creek
- Savatheda Fynes
- The Scout Association of the Bahamas
- Scouting and Guiding in the Bahamas
- Seal Cay
- Sebastian Bach
- Serranilla Bank
- Shadow cabinet (Bahamas)
- Sidney Poitier
- Simon Creek
- SkyBahamas Airlines
- Snug Corner
- Somerset Creek
- South Abaco
- South Andros
- South Andros Airport
- South Bimini Airport
- South Eleuthera
- Southern Air Charter
- Spanish Cay Airport
- Spanish Wells
- Spring City, Bahamas
- Spring Point Airport
- Squatting in the Bahamas
- St. Andrews Presbyterian Kirk
- St Andrew's School (Bahamas)
- St. Augustine's College (Bahamas)
- St. Francis Xavier Cathedral, Nassau
- Stafford Creek
- Stafford Sands
- Staniard Creek
- Staniel Cay
- Staniel Cay Airport
- Starve Creek
- Stella Maris Airport
- Stocking Island
- Supreme Court of the Bahamas

== T ==
- Tarpum Bay
- Telecommunications in the Bahamas
- Television in the Bahamas
- Television stations in the Bahamas by call sign
- The Bahamas Great Abaco Classic
- The Bahamas Great Exuma Classic
- The Bahamas–India relations
- The Bahamas Local Government Act 1996
- The Bluff, Bahamas
- The Island School
- The Scout Association of the Bahamas
- Thomas Robinson Stadium
- Mychal Thompson
- Timber Creek (Bahamas)
- Tongue of the Ocean
- Tonique Williams-Darling
- Tour of the Bahamas
- Town & Country Predators
- Transport in the Bahamas
- Treasure Cay
- Treasure Cay Airport
- Trevor Harvey (basketball)
- Tropic of Cancer
- Tropics and North Temperate Zone
- Troy Kemp
- Troy McIntosh

== U ==
- United Nations, member state since 1973
- United States Ambassador to the Bahamas
- University of the Bahamas

== V ==
- Vanguard Party
- Viktor Kožený
- Visa policy of Bahamas
- Visa requirements for Bahamian citizens

== W ==
- Walker's Cay
- Walker's Cay Airport
- West End Airport
- West End, Grand Bahama
- West Grand Bahama
- West Indies
- Western Air
- Western Hemisphere
- Wikimedia Atlas of the Bahamas
- Wikipedia:WikiProject Topic outline/Drafts/Topic outline of the Bahamas
- Windermere Island
- Workers' Party (Bahamas)

== Z ==
- ZNS-1
- ZNS-TV

== See also ==
- Commonwealth of Nations
- List of international rankings
- Lists of country-related topics
- Outline of geography
- Outline of North America
- Outline of the Bahamas
- United Nations
