= 1949 Bahamian general election =

General elections were held in the Bahamas in June and July 1949, the last entirely non-partisan elections in the country. This was the second election in which the secret ballot was used in New Providence and the first in which the secret ballot was used for the Out Islands.

== Elected MPs ==
Number	Name	Party	District	Ethnicity
1	Stafford Lofthouse Sands	Independent	New Providence - Nassau City (first place)	White
2	Raymond W. Sawyer	Independent	New Providence - Nassau City (second place)	White
3	Roland Theodore Symonette	Independent	New Providence East (first place)	White
4	Étienne Dupuch	Independent	New Providence East (second place)	White
5	Gerald Christopher Cash	Independent	New Providence West (first place)	Black
6	Marcus Hercules Bethel	Independent	New Providence West (second place)	Black
7	Bertram Augustus Cambridge	Independent	New Providence South	Black
8	Claudius Roland Walker	Independent	New Providence South	Black
9	Charles Walter Frederick Bethell	Independent	Grand Bahama & Bimini	White
10	Phillip George Drover Bethell	Independent	Andros & Berry Islands (first place)	White
11	Basil Herbert McKinney	Independent	Andros & Berry Islands (second place)	White
12	Frank Holmes Christie	Independent	Abaco (first place)	White
13	Leonard Thompson	Independent	Abaco (second place)	White
14	Harold Johnson	Independent	Abaco (third place)	White
15	R. Newton Higgs	Independent	Harbour Island (first place)	White
16	R.R.A. Farrington	Independent	Harbour Island (second place)	White
17	Alvin Braynen	Independent	Harbour Island (third place)	White
18	George William Kelly Roberts	Independent	Eleuthera (first place)	White
19	George Baker	Independent	Eleuthera (second place)	White
20	Asa Hubert Pritchard	Independent	Eleuthera (third place)	White
21	Harold George Christie	Independent	Cat Island (first place)	White
22	William Cartwright	Independent	Cat Island (second place)	Black
23	Donald B. McKinney	Independent	Exuma (first place)	White
24	Robert Symonette	Independent	Exuma (second place)	White
25	Roy M. Solomon	Independent	Rum Cay & San Salvador	White
26	George Loran Pyfrom	Independent	Long Island (First place)	White
27	Henry Milton Taylor	Independent	Long Island (Second place)	White
28	Artemus Pritchard	Independent	Crooked Islands, Long Cay, & Acklins	White
29	Geoffrey Allardyce Bethell	Independent	Mayaguana & Inagua Islands	White
Source: sirrandolfawkes.com

== Other ==
Charles W. F. Bethell, Phillip G. D. Bethell, and Geoffrey A. Bethell were three brothers, sons of Charles E. Bethel.
