= Health in the Bahamas =

In recent years, the Bahamian healthcare system has expanded its infrastructure and modernized its digital services. New facilities include the Freeport Health Campus on Grand Bahama, which was 30% complete as of late 2026, and ongoing upgrades to Princess Margaret Hospital in Nassau.

Healthcare costs in The Bahamas remain considerably lower than in the United States. For local residents, household out-of-pocket health spending is about 42% of the US level. For international patients, private facilities such as Doctors Hospital offer bundled pricing that is 35 to 40 percent lower than the US average. Still, there are high levels of health and economic inequality and most of the population are unable to obtain private health insurance. Catastrophic spending on healthcare has bankrupted many patients and their families.

== Diseases ==
Vaccination against diseases such as measles and diphtheria has lowered the infection and death rate among children. The infection rate of HIV/AIDS is quite high — in 2013, an estimated 500 people died from AIDS in the Bahamas.

Rates of non-communicable diseases have risen to the point where treatment costs challenge the viability of the healthcare system.

== Healthcare ==
The National Health Insurance program was established in 2017. This program gives anyone who is a resident of the Bahamas, healthcare for no cost up front when receiving the service. There are about 42,000 Bahamians or 10% of the population that have enrolled, but membership is voluntary. The Out Islands are serviced by small government clinics. There are 80 primary care providers, including 4 private labs which provides care across New Providence, Grand Bahama, Abaco and Exuma.

About 8% of GDP is spent on healthcare in 2018. The Bahamas is one of the least efficient nations in the world when it comes to value-based care, according to the National Health Insurance Authority.

A tax on wages to fund National Health Insurance was proposed in 2018.

In December 2017 there were 349 registered nurses and 98 clinically trained nurses in the Department of Public Health, 753 registered and 283 clinically trained nurses in the Public Hospitals Authority. 226 registered nurses were needed by the Department of Public Health and 302 by the Public Hospitals Authority.

== See also ==
- List of hospitals in Bahamas
