= British Bahamas =

British Crown Colony in the Caribbean (1648–1973)

Crown Colony of the Bahamas
- 1648–1973
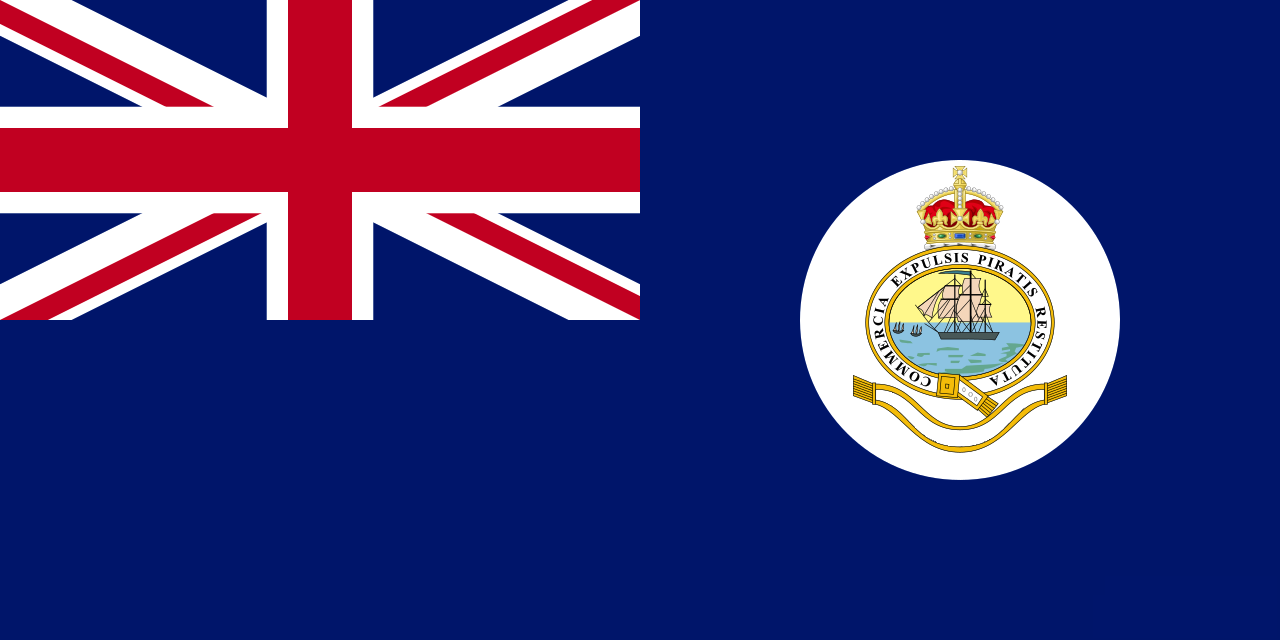
- Flag Coat of arms
- Motto: Expulsis piratis, Restituta commercia (Pirates repulsed, Commerce restored)
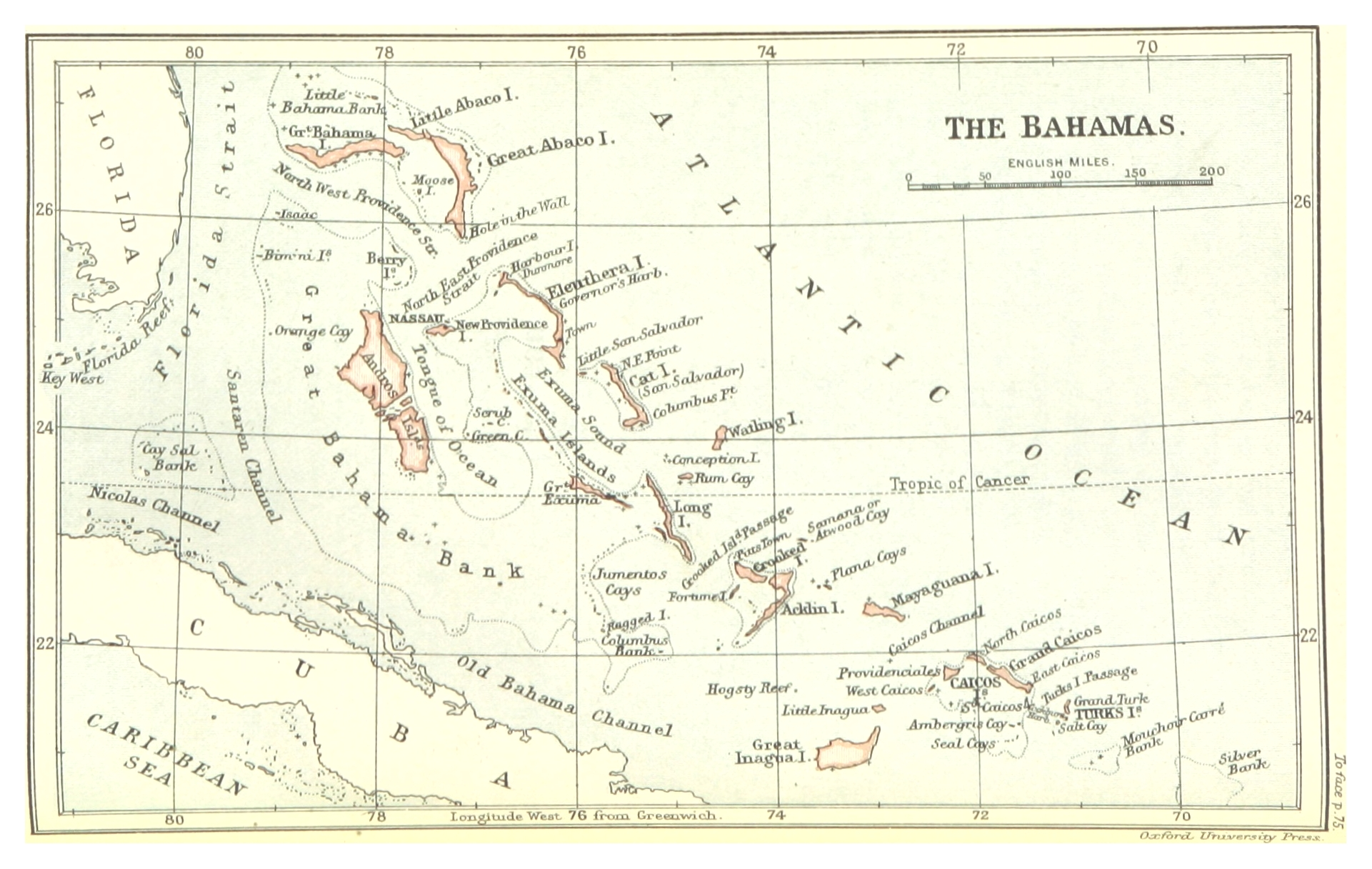
- 19th century map of the Crown Colony of the Bahamas
- Status: British colony
- Capital: Nassau
- Official languages: English; Bahamian Creole; Native languages
- Religion: Anglicanism
- Demonym: Bahamian
- Establishment: 1648 CE
- ISO 3166 code: BS
Succeeded by
Commonwealth of the Bahamas
- Today part of: The Bahamas

The British Bahamas were a British colony that existed from 1648 until 1973, when it became an independent nation. It is also referred to as the British Administered Bahamas, Commonwealth of the Bahamas, or the Crown Colony of the Bahamas. The colony changed hands between private settlers, English lords, and the British Crown of the United Kingdom during the 325 years it was a colony. The Bahamas territory is an archipelago of approximately 700 islands and 30 reefs located in the Atlantic Ocean in the region of the Caribbean. The nation was dissolved in 1973 during Bahamian independence.

== History ==
=== Initial grant ===
In 1629, King Charles I granted the territories of "Bahama and all other Isles and Islands lying southerly there or neare upon the foresayd continent" to Sir Robert Heath, the Attorney General in London. No effort to explore or settle the islands would ever be made on the part of Heath, and Englishmen would not arrive there in earnest for another decade.

=== First settlements ===
The arrival of the Spanish in the early 16th century largely destroyed the Indigenous Lucayan population, who were enslaved and transported to other colonies, leaving the islands relatively uninhabited by the mid-16th century.

British interest in the Bahamas emerged in 1647. Captain William Sayle, who had twice been governor of Bermuda, took the leadership of seeking a colony that would be a haven for religious freedom. Sayle and about 70 settlers, consisting of Bermudan religious independents sailed from Bermuda for the Bahamas by October 1648.

Distribution of Lucayan, Taíno and other tribal peoples in the Caribbean prior to European contact

.

The settlers from Bermuda established a colony called Eleuthera in 1648, naming it after the Greek word for freedom. These settlers were known as the Eleutheran Adventurers and sought religious liberty and economic opportunity. Their initial attempts to establish a sustainable colony faced challenges, including scarce resources and conflicts with the Spanish. Settlers anticipated to establish a plantation colony for sugar and tobacco, but found the soil relatively unproductive. Sayle, along with a number of the initial settlers, returned to Bermuda. The remaining settlers founded communities on Harbour Island and Saint George's Cay (Spanish Wells) at the north end of Eleuthera. In 1670 about 20 families lived in the Eleuthera communities.

In 1666, a new wave of settlers arrived from Bermuda and established the city of New Providence. Charlestowne, named for Charles II, was established as well. Charlestowne was later renamed to Nassau, after King William III assumed the throne, with the German region of Nassau being in his family's possession. Lords proprietors, whom King Charles II had granted the colony of South Carolina on the American mainland, grew interested in the prospects of the Bahamas. They appointed Sayle as governor over South Carolina. In 1670, The Duke of Albemarle and five other lords were given a grant to establish a civil government in the Bahamas. New Providence was made the seat of government. There was no formal governor of the territories until the return of the islands to the crown in the 18th century.

This settlement laid the groundwork for future British expansion in the region.

=== Pirate Republic ===
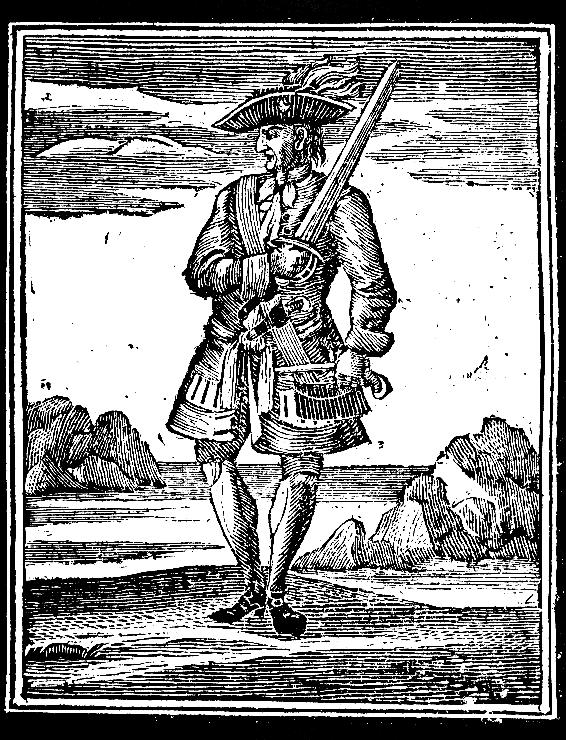
Engraving of John Rackham, an English pirate that was associated with the pirates nest of Nassau.

The permanent settlement of the Bahamas began several decades of organised pirate activity in the islands, with figures like Edward Teach (Blackbeard) and John Rackham using the Bahamas as a base. A loose confederation of pirate gangs operated a short-lived republic, with its base at Nassau. Many European criminals sought riches in the New World. Englishmen who were there due to initial waves of settlement often turned to piracy, as it was lucrative, and other means of subsistence in the territory were relatively ineffective. Buccaneers heavily raided Spanish ships and fleets, leading to frequent retaliatory raids. The proprietors were not active in defending the islands or incriminating the pirates at first. This period is often known as the Golden Age of Piracy in the Caribbean.

=== Crown colony and campaign against piracy ===
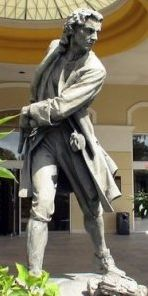
Statue of governor Woodes Rogers in Nassau

In 1717, the lords proprietors returned the islands to the crown, and the Bahamas became a British Crown Colony. Captain Woodes Rogers was appointed as the new royal governor. Rogers implemented strict measures to suppress piracy. King George appointed Rogers to oversee the execution of a proclamation granting a pardon to any pirate who surrendered to a British crown within one year. When he arrived with an army in 1718, 1,000 pirates surrendered and received royal pardons. 8 pirates were hanged. Rogers declared the islands "clean" of pirates by the end of 1718.

The Bahamas developed under British rule as a strategic and economic outpost. Its location along transatlantic trade routes made it a valuable asset, while its economy relied on maritime activities, including fishing, shipbuilding, and salt production. The introduction of enslaved Africans underpinned the development of plantation agriculture, particularly cotton, though the islands' poor soil limited large-scale success.

Nassau was briefly captured by the United States Navy in 1776 during the American Revolution but was returned after a few days. After the revolution, many loyalist American colonists settled in the Bahamas due to favourable living conditions offered by the Crown. Many of the American settlers brought slaves with them and increased the population. Much of East Florida's population during the British period ended up leaving with the Bahamas being one of the biggest destinations they went to. Cotton plantations were established, and yielded well briefly, but were soon exhausted due to soil quality and insect pests. The Bahamas experienced multiple slave revolts during this time period leading up to abolition.

=== Abolition of slavery and 19th century ===
The abolition of slavery throughout the British Empire in 1834 marked a significant turning point. Former slaves in the Bahamas faced limited economic opportunities but gradually built communities centered around fishing, farming, and small-scale trade. Former slaves and slave masters struggled to coexist on the islands, and social tensions were high. Over time, African cultural influences profoundly shaped Bahamian society.

During the American Civil War, the Bahamas experienced an economic boom as a center for Confederate blockade running. However, the collapse of the Confederacy brought an end to this prosperity.

=== 20th century ===
Similarly, during Prohibition in the United States, the Bahamas became a hub for rum-running, providing another short-lived economic boost. With the Great Depression the Bahamas experienced severe economic decline with a variety of factors including: three hurricanes in 1920s (in 1926, 1928 and 1929 respectively), high tariffs from the United States, agriculture being in a poor state because of the poor soil quality, outdated methods and "poor marketing techniques, and general neglect", sponge fishing which was a sizeable industry in the Bahamas was impacted after a fungal disease hit it in late 1938 killing off 99% of sponge beds in the span of 2 months and a hurricane in 1932. In light of all these events the Bahamas embraced tourism building infrastructure and accommodations to accommodate tourists. During the 1930s the population became more centralized as the Out Islands population saw population decline due to poor conditions as residents went to Nassau which saw its population increase and by 1935 1/3rd of the population of the Bahamas lived there.

The 20th century brought gradual political reforms. The Bahamian Progressive Liberal Party (PLP), formed in 1953, championed the rights of the predominantly Black majority, challenging the political dominance of the White merchant elite. This movement laid the groundwork for the islands’ eventual push for self-governance.

==== Independence ====
In 1964, the Bahamas achieved internal self-government under a new constitution, with Lynden Pindling becoming the country's first Black Premier in 1967. Pindling, leader of the PLP, played a central role in advocating for greater autonomy and addressing social inequalities. These events officially ended the Crown Colony of the Bahamas and transitioned the country to independence.

The Bahamas gained full independence on July 10, 1973, becoming a sovereign nation within the Commonwealth. The British monarch remained the ceremonial head of state, represented by a Governor-General, while the Bahamas established its own parliamentary democracy.

== Society ==
=== Demographics ===
The Bahamas had a population of 168,812 in 1970.

Population of the Bahamas by census year
Year	Total
1970	168,812
1963	130,220
1953	84,841
1943	68,846
1931	59,828
1921	53,031
1911	55,944
1901	53,735
1891	47,565
1881	43,521
1871	39,162
1861	35,487
1851	27,519
1845	26,491
1838	21,794

=== Media ===
Radio broadcasting began in the Bahamas starting in 1936 with a single channel, ZNS ran by the Bahamas Broadcasting and Television Commission (starting in 1957) in Nassau and became commercial in 1950. A second channel was later launched in 1962 but was only available on New Providence. Television was not directly broadcast in the Bahamas but could be obtained from Florida in certain parts of it and television only became available in 1977.

A newspaper called the Bahama Gazette was published by John Wells from 1784 to 1799 in Nassau and it was likely the first newspaper published in the Bahamas. John Wells was a loyalist who lived in East Florida where he previously published another newspaper named the East Florida Gazette before moving to the Bahamas.

== See also ==
- British Commonwealth of Nations
- History of the Bahamas
- List of governors of the Bahamas
