= Bahama Lobster Pirates =

- Genre: Reality
- Starring: C.W Malone, Cliff Newbold, Chuck Pinder, Jody Pinder, Thomas Pinder, Douglas Sands
- Country of origin: United States
- Original language: English
- No. of seasons: 1
- No. of episodes: 10

Production
- Production company: Fish Tales Film Production

Original release
- Network: Sportsman Channel
- Release: February 17 – June 16, 2014

Bahama Lobster Pirates is a reality series that follows six commercial lobster boats in the Bahamas, as they harvest lobster. The grand prize is $100 million.

== The Crews ==
Atlantic Lady

Vessel: 72 foot custom built trawler.

Home Port: Spanish Wells, Bahamas Crew of 7, Captained by Jody Pinder

New Wrinkle

Vessel: 75 foot St. Augustine Trawler

Home Port: Spanish Wells, Bahamas Crew of 13, Captained by Cliff Newbold

Water Spout

Vessel: 60 foot Desko Trawler

Home Port: Spanish Wells, Bahamas Crew of 7, Captained by Thomas Pinder

Sea Gem

Vessel: 78 foot St. Augustine Trawler

Home Port: Spanish Wells, Bahamas Crew of 11, Captained by Chuck

Summer Place

Vessel: 62 foot Desko Trawler

Home Port: Nassau, Bahamas Crew of 8, Captained by CW Malone

LD

Vessel: 58 foot custom built trawler

Home Port: Abaco, Bahamas Crew of 8, Captained by Douglas Sands

== Episodes ==
| No. | Title | Original release date |
|---|---|---|
| 1 | "Opening Day" | February 15, 2014 |
| 2 | "Rookie Hookin'" | February 22, 2014 |
| 3 | "Muddy Waters & Fly Bys" | March 1, 2014 |
| 4 | "Dangers of the Sea" | March 8, 2014 |
| 5 | "Stormy Skies" | March 15, 2014 |
| 6 | "Skills that Pay the Bills" | March 22, 2014 |
| 7 | "The Right Thing to Do" | March 29, 2014 |
| 8 | "Paradise Found" | April 5, 2014 |
| 9 | "The Chaos Before the Storm" | April 12, 2014 |
| 10 | "That Sinking Feeling & Pay Day" | April 19, 2014 |
