= White people in the Bahamas =

White Bahamians
Total population
- 46,920 (2010); 9.3% of the Bahamian population

Regions with significant populations
- Spanish Wells, Dunmore Town, Eleuthera, Abaco Islands, Long Island, New Providence

Languages
- Bahamian English • Bahamian Creole • Spanish • Portuguese • Greek

Related ethnic groups
- English, Welsh, Irish, Scottish, Spaniards, Portuguese

White Bahamians are Bahamian citizens of European ancestry, most of whom trace their ancestry back to the British Isles. Bahamians of European descent are sometimes called "Conchs", a term that is also applied to people of White Bahamian descent in Florida. White Bahamians were a majority in the 18th century, but as of 1991, constituted less than 10% of the Bahamian population.

== History ==
Christopher Columbus's first landfall in the Americas was in the Bahamas, but after the Spanish had removed all of the native Lucayans from the archipelago by 1520, they showed little interest in the islands. A group of religious dissidents from Bermuda who settled on Eleuthera in 1648 consisted primarily of people of European descent, but included a few slaves of African descent. Later migrants from Bermuda to Eleuthera also consisted primarily of white people, but included a few free and enslaved black people. Starting in 1666, immigrants, again primarily white, from Bermuda, Jamaica, and elsewhere began settling on New Providence and other islands in the Bahamas.

By 1783 blacks outnumbered whites in the Bahamas. The Bahamas remained loyal to Britain during the American Revolutionary War. During and after the war, approximately 1,600 white Loyalist refugees, many with slaves of African descent, settled in the Bahamas. A survey in 1783 found 1,380 taxable persons, presumably adult males, in the islands. About two-thirds of those taxable persons were black, primarily slaves. In 1788, the number of white male heads of families had increased by a little over one-half, while the number of slaves had almost tripled.

After World War II, greater accessibility to the US mainland led to the rapid growth of industry. The minority white population benefited most from this new-found prosperity, as they controlled the government and economy. White Bahamians owned many successful hotels, restaurants, and stores at a time when American money was flowing into the economy and causing the construction of numerous new hotels and other establishments.

In 1966, White Bahamians constituted approximately 11.5% of the population of the Bahamas.

== Demographics ==
White Bahamians constitute the majority (81.95%) of the district of Spanish Wells, which is located on St. George's Cay and Russell Island, north of Eleuthera. White Bahamians are also a significant minority in Long Island (18.07%) and the Abaco Islands (13.76%), in which several settlements and small cays are majority white. The largest concentration of white people in the Bahamas is in New Providence, which is home to 9,436 white Bahamians as of 2010.

== See also ==
- Conch (people)
- Greek Bahamians
- White Bermudians
- White Caribbeans
- History of the Jews in Latin America and the Caribbean#Bahamas
- Afro-Bahamians
