= 1935 Bahamian general election =

General elections were held in the Bahamas in 1935 after parliament was dissolved in May. The elections were the last ones held entirely by public ballot; a bill providing for a trial of secret ballots in New Providence (but not the Family Islands) was passed in July 1939, with the trial becoming permanent in 1942.

== Elected MPs ==
Number	Name	Party	District	Ethnicity
1	Arthur H. Sands	Independent	New Providence - Nassau City (first place)	White
2	Stafford Sands (Note: Elected in 1937 by-election)	Independent	New Providence - Nassau City (second place)	White
3	Roland Symonette	Independent	New Providence East (first place)	White
4	Leon Walton Young	Independent	New Providence East (second place)	Black
5	A. F. Adderley	Independent	New Providence West (first place)	Black
6	Percy E. Christie	Independent	New Providence West (second place)	White
7	Audrey Solomon	Independent	New Providence South (first place)	White
8	Claudius Roland Walker	Independent	New Providence South (second place)	Black
9	J. K. A. Kelly	Independent	Grand Bahama & Bimini	White
10	R. H. Curry	Independent	Andros & Berry Islands (first place)	White
11	Basil Herbert McKinney	Independent	Andros & Berry Islands (second place)	White
12	B. R. Russell	Independent	Abaco (first place)	White
13	J. W. Roberts	Independent	Abaco (second place)	White
14	Frank Holmes Christie	Independent	Abaco (third place)	White
15	W. C. B. Johnson	Independent	Harbour Island (first place)	White
16	R.R.A. Farrington	Independent	Harbour Island (second place)	White
17	H. N. Chipman	Independent	Harbour Island (third place)	White
18	R. W. Sawyer	Independent	Eleuthera (first place)	White
19	George William Kelly Roberts	Independent	Eleuthera (second place)	White
20	O. H. Curry	Independent	Eleuthera (third place)	White
21	Alvin Braynen	Independent	Cat Island(first place)	White
22	Harold George Christie	Independent	Cat Island(second place)	White
23	George Murphy	Independent	Exuma (first place)	White
24	E. V. Solomon	Independent	Exuma (second place)	White
25	G. W. Higgs	Independent	Rum Cay & San Salvador	White
26	L. C. Brice	Independent	Long Island (First place)	White
27	L. G. Dupuch	Independent	Long Island (Second place)	White
28	R. G. Collins	Independent	Crooked Islands, Long Cay, & Acklins	White
29	Etienne Dupuch	Independent	Mayaguana & Inagua Islands	White
Source: Bethell
