= Go Down Moses (Bahamas) =

Bahamian rhyming spiritual

"Go Down, Moses"

Song
- Genre: Bahamian Rhyming spiritual
- Songwriter(s): Unknown

Go Down Moses is a Bahamian Rhyming Spiritual that was documented by Charles Edwards in his book "Bahama songs and stories" in 1895.

== Lyrics ==
Go down Moses, hol' de key,
Don' let de vwin' blo' on de righteous,
Hey! Hey! Hey, my soul.

Hey! come a fish by the name of vwale,
Swallowed brothe' Jonah by the head an' tail-a,
Hey! Hey! Hey, my soul.

You want to go to heaven vw'en you die,
Jus' stop you' tongue from telling them lies,
Hey! Hey! Hey, my soul.
