= List of companies of the Bahamas =

Location of the Bahamas

The Bahamas is an archipelagic state of the Lucayan Archipelago consisting of more than 700 islands, cays, and islets in the Atlantic Ocean. The Bahamas became an independent Commonwealth realm in 1973, retaining Queen Elizabeth II as its monarch. In terms of gross domestic product per capita, the Bahamas is one of the richest countries in the Americas (following the United States and Canada), with an economy based on tourism and finance. Tourism alone provides an estimated 45% of the gross domestic product (GDP) and employs about half the Bahamian workforce. In 2016, over 3 million tourists visited the Bahamas, most of whom are from the United States and Canada.

== Notable firms ==
This list includes notable companies with primary headquarters located in the country. The industry and sector follow the Industry Classification Benchmark taxonomy. Organizations which have ceased operations are included and noted as defunct.

Notable companies Status: P=Private, S=State; A=Active, D=Defunct
Name	Industry	Sector	Headquarters	Founded	Notes	Status	
Abaco Air	Consumer services	Airlines	Marsh Harbour	1975	Charter airline, defunct 2013	P	D
Bahamas Electricity Corporation	Utilities	Conventional electricity	Nassau	1956		S	A
Bahamas Securities Exchange	Financials	Investment services	Nassau	1999	Exchange	P	A
BahamasAir	Consumer services	Airlines	Nassau	1973	National airline	S	A
Bank of London and Montreal	Financials	Banking	Nassau	1958	Bank, defunct 1971	P	D
BTC	Telecommunications	Mobile telecommunications	Nassau	1966	State-owned	S	A
Clonaid	Health care	Biotechnology	Nassau	1997	Cloning	P	A
Compass Point Studios	Consumer services	Broadcasting & entertainment	Nassau	1977	Record label, defunct 2010	P	D
Flamingo Air	Consumer services	Airlines	Nassau	2004	Charter airline	P	A
Golden Wings Charters	Consumer services	Airlines	Nassau	2000	Charter airline	P	A
SkyBahamas Airlines	Consumer services	Airlines	Nassau	1988	Airline	P	A
Southern Air Charter	Consumer services	Airlines	Nassau	1998	Charter airline	P	A
Western Air	Consumer services	Airlines	Nicholls Town	2001	Airline	P	A

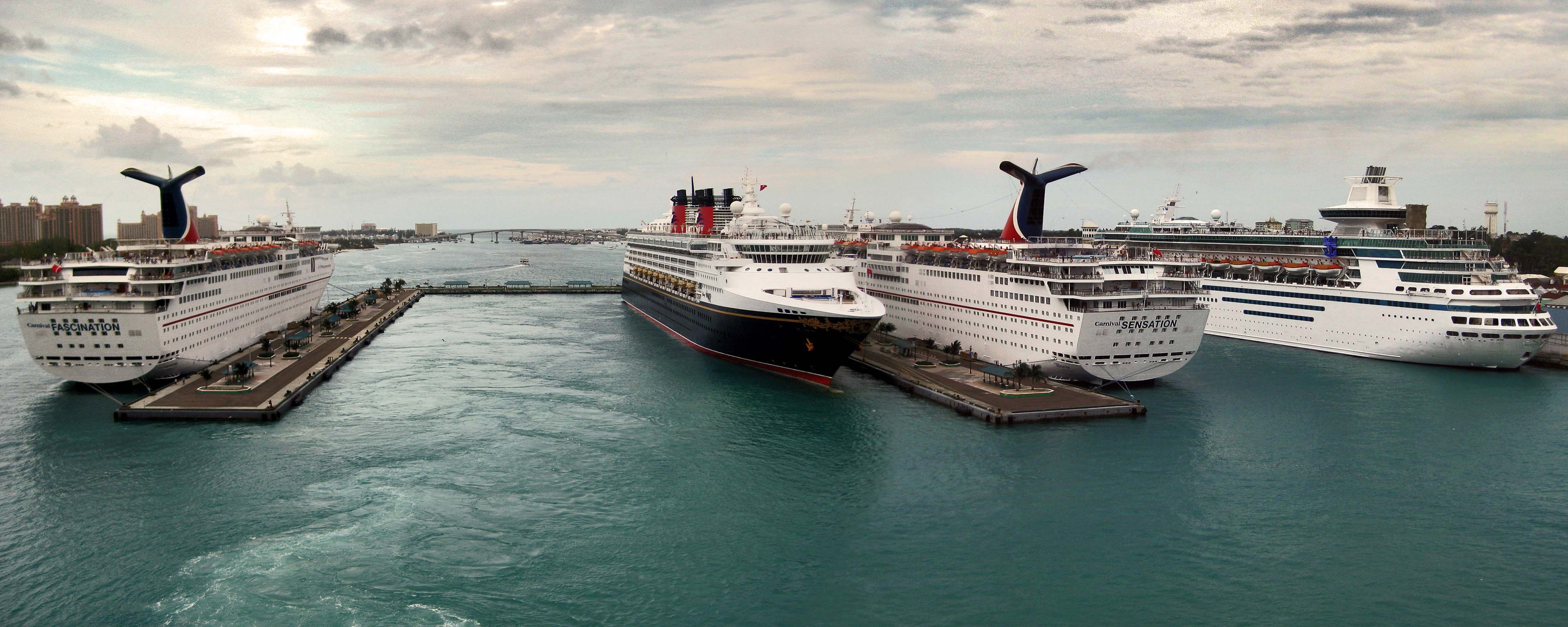
Cruise ships in Nassau Harbour

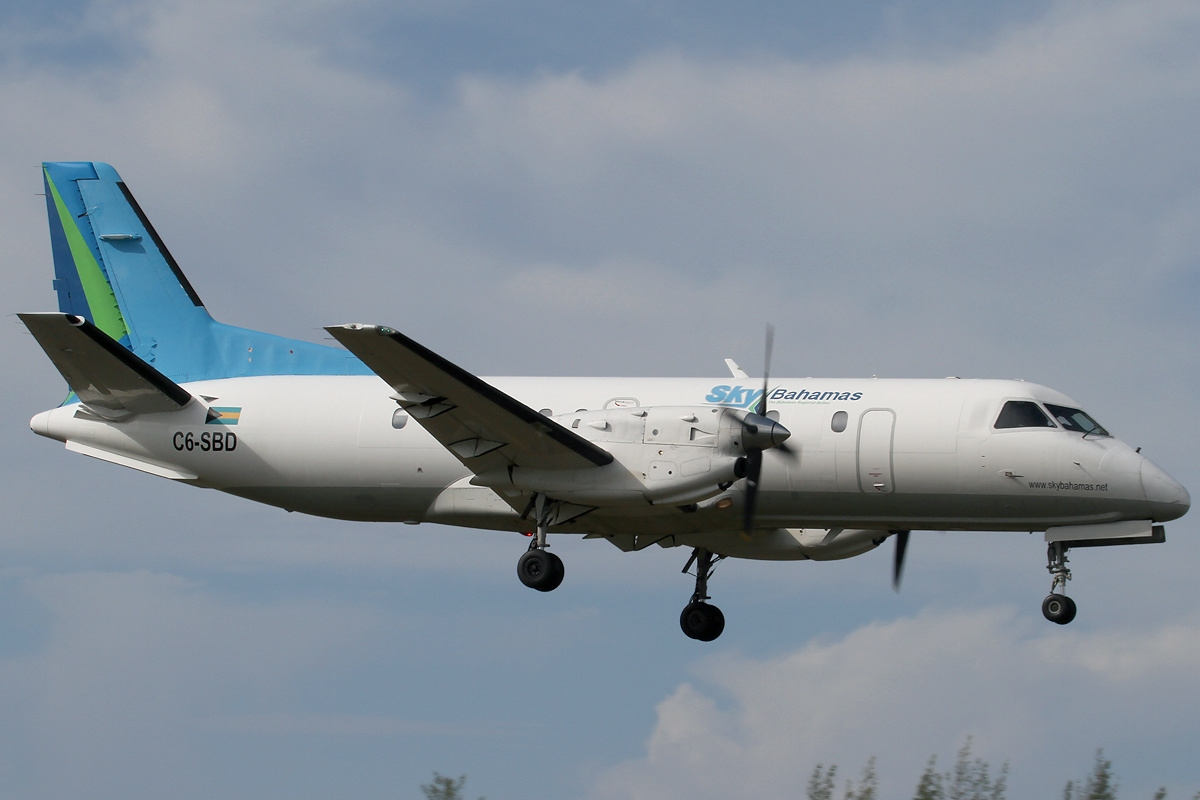
SkyBahamas Airlines Saab-Fairchild SF-340A

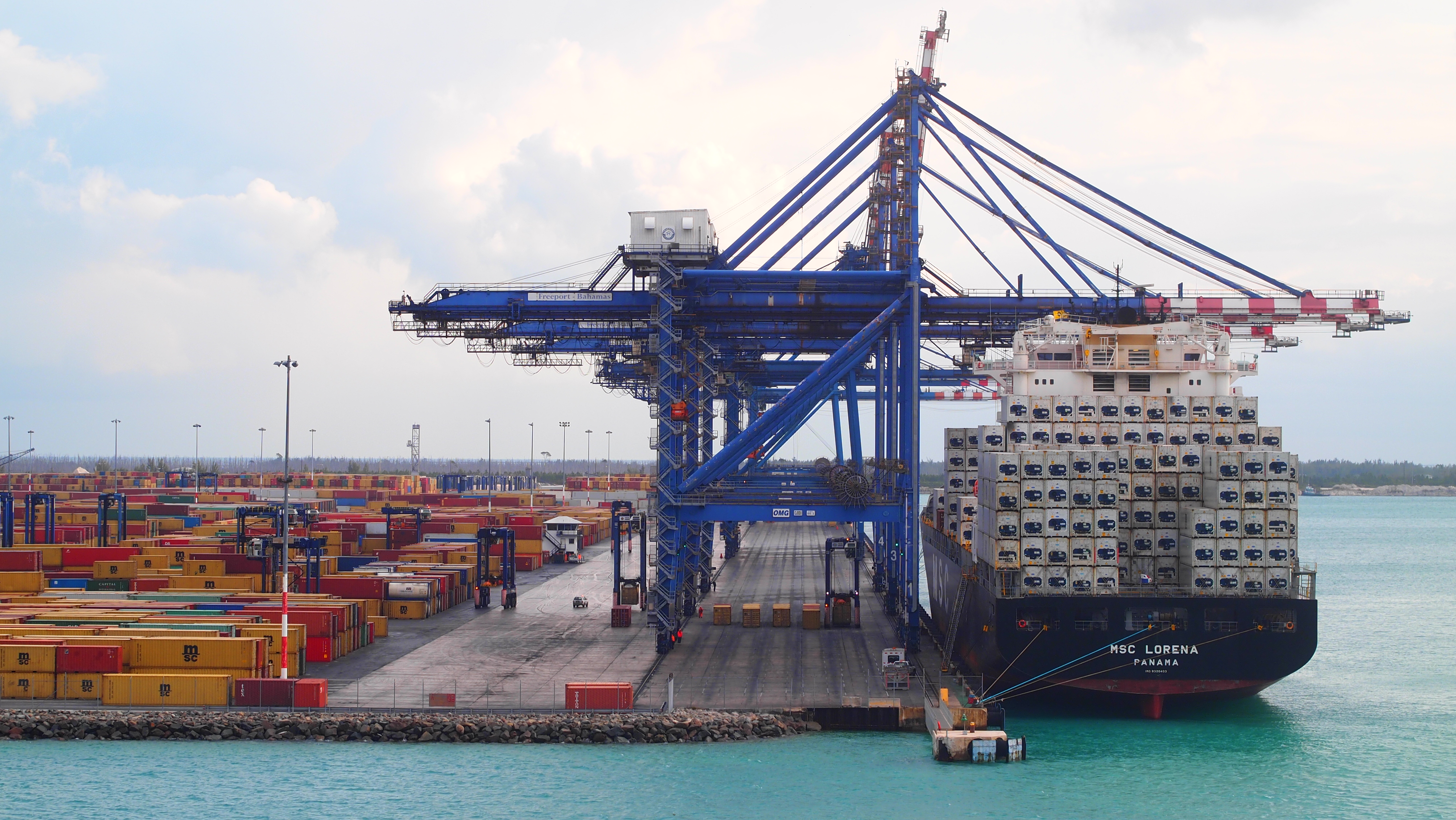
Container ship MSC Lorena at Freeport, Bahamas
