= Sandra Dean-Patterson =

Bahamian psychologist

- Occupation: Founder of Bahamas Crisis Centre

Sandra Dean-Patterson is a psychologist and human rights activist in The Bahamas. Dean-Patterson established the Bahamas Council for the Disabled in 1973, founded the Bahamas Crisis Center (formerly the Women's Crisis Centre) in 1982, established The Bahamas Association of Social Workers, and founded the Caribbean Association of Rehabilitative Therapists.

For her career advocating for human rights in The Bahamas, Dean-Patterson was awarded The Bahamas Order of Merit in 1997, Bahamian Icon Award for Humanitarianism in 2014, and the United States State Department's International Woman of Courage Award in 2011.

== Career as Human rights activist ==
Dean-Patterson opened the Women's Crisis Center in 1982, the first in the Caribbean, to provide services to women who were subject to physical, sexual and emotional abuse. In 1995, the organization changed its name to address all domestic violence in families, and not just towards women. She published a handbook on domestic violence used by the Royal Bahamas Police Force.

Throughout Dean-Patterson's career, she has advocated for legislation in The Bahamas to address domestic and sexual violence. Key legislation passed include amendments to the Domestic Violence and Sexual Offenses Act of 1991 to broadened the definition of rape, to address issues related to pornography and other forms of touching. The Child Protection Act of 2007 and the Domestic Violence Protection Orders Act of 2007. In 1991, she lobbied for the Sexual Offences Act to include protection for partners who were not married.

== Writings and research ==
- Jekel, James F., Conn David F. Allen, Henry Podlewski, Nelson Clarke, Sandra Dean-Patterson, and Paul Cartwright. "Epidemic Freebase Cocaine Abuse: A Case Study from the Bahamas." In The Cocaine Crisis, pp. 125–132. Springer, Boston, MA, 1987.
- Nicolls, Donna, Camille Russell-Smith, Sandra Dean-Patterson, Lindel D. Deveaux-Stuart, Ingrid Gibson-Mobley, Elizabeth J. Williams, Antoinette Pinder-Darling, and William J. Fielding. "Attitudes of high school students regarding intimate relationships and gender norms in New Providence, The Bahamas." The International Journal of Bahamian Studies 20, no. 1 (2014): 38–51.
- Dean-Patterson, Sandra. "Cocaine and the Bahamian Woman: Treatment Issues." In The Cocaine Crisis, pp. 145–159. Springer, Boston, MA, 1987.
- Smart, Reginald G., and Sandra Dean Patterson. "Comparison of alcohol, tobacco, and illicit drug use among students and delinquents in the Bahamas." (1990).
- Dean-Patterson, Sandra Elaine. "A LONGITUDINAL STUDY OF CHANGES IN BAHAMIAN DRINKING, 1969-1977." (1979): 7006-7006.
