= List of defunct airlines of the Bahamas =

This is a list of defunct airlines of The Bahamas.

Airline	Image	IATA	ICAO	Callsign	Commenced operations	Ceased operations	Notes
Air Bahama		IW			1966	1981	
Abaco Air					1975	2013	
Bahamas Air Ferries					1998	1998	
Bahama Airways					1936	1970	
Bahamas World Airways		WQ	WQA		1971	1982	
Cat Island Air					1987	2011	
EFS Bahamas					1973	1977	
Flamingo Air Lines			FMR	Flamingo Air	1971	1973	
Grand Bahama Island					1983	1983	
Laker Airways		7Z	LBH		1992	2004	
LucayaAir					1959	1987	renamed/merged to Taino Air Services
Out Island Airways		OE			1971	1973	
SkyBahamas Airlines		Q7	SBM	TROPICAL SKIES	1989	2017	
Taino Air Services					1987	2002	
Trinity Air Bahamas		T6	TBH		1992	1994	

== See also ==
- List of airlines of the Bahamas
- List of airports in the Bahamas
