= Greek Bahamians =

Total population
- Less than 1% of the population

Regions with significant populations
- New Providence Grand Bahama

Languages
- Bahamian English, Bahamian Creole, Greek

Religion
- Greek Orthodox, Jewish

Related ethnic groups
- European Bahamians

Greek Bahamians (Greek: Ελληνομπαχαμιανός, romanized: Ellinompakhamianós) comprise Bahamian citizens of either full or partial Greek heritage. Most residents, if not the entire Greek community, are the descendants of Greek labourers who came to the Bahamas in 1880s to develop the sponging industry.

== Migration history ==
Greek migrants were expert spongers from the Aegean Islands, who had lived an impoverished life as fishermen in their home country; however, after their arrival in the Bahamas, they employed local native Afro-Bahamian labourers and used their international connections to move up the economic chain. They benefited greatly as European immigrants having advantages and opportunities over natives - their economic success earned them resentment from the native fishermen, leading to the growth of opposition to immigration. Families from Kalymnos later followed as bakers, restaurateurs, and shoemakers. After the death of the sponge beds due to a fungal infection, most other Greeks moved into the restaurant and hospitality industry as well, while others branched out into retailing and furniture making (thus becoming the first to manufacture furniture in the islands). Some also migrated onwards, going to Tarpon Springs, Florida, to develop the sponging trade there. However, the anti-immigrant sentiment in the Bahamas continued to grow through the early 20th century, leading to restrictive immigration policies implemented in the late 1920s.

The Bahamas also later became a tourist destination for Greeks from the United States, Canada, Australia etc. some of whom maintain vacation homes in Nassau and its surroundings which includes the Greek Australian professional tennis player Nick Kyrgios.

== Culture ==
Greek-Bahamians have been able to preserve some of their culture, including Greek cuisine; at one time, nearly all of the restaurants in downtown Nassau, as well as the airport catering service, were owned by Greeks. The Greek Orthodox Church of the Annunciation, on West Street in Nassau, was built in 1932; it is noted as an example of historic architecture in the Caribbean islands. It consists of a small wood-frame octagonal Byzantine tower, topped by a groined dome. The community holds festivals on various dates of significance in Greek politics and the Greek Orthodox religion, including Easter (celebrated according to the Julian calendar), the anniversary of Greek independence, and the Epiphany. At the latter, they preserve the custom, referred to as "quaint" by community members, of throwing a cross into the sea and holding a competition to see who can swim out and retrieve it first. A Greek dance gala is also held biannually.

Most Greeks in the Bahamas belong to the middle and upper-middle class. Many young Greek-Bahamians of the second or third generation go overseas for their tertiary education, especially to the United States, Canada, and the United Kingdom, before returning home to take up careers. Common professions include law, medicine, and the construction business.

== See also ==
- White Bahamians

== Sources ==
- Crain, Edward E. (1994), Historic architecture in the Caribbean Islands, University Press of Florida, ISBN 978-0-8130-1293-3
- Craton, Michael; Saunders, Gail (2000), Islanders in the Stream: A History of the Bahamian People, Volume 2: From the Ending of Slavery to the Twenty-First Century, University of Georgia Press, ISBN 978-0-8203-2284-1
- Gravette, Andrew Gerald (2000), Architectural heritage of the Caribbean: an A-Z of historic buildings, Signal Books, ISBN 978-1-902669-09-0
- Johnson, Howard (1986), "'Safeguarding our traders': The beginnings of immigration restrictions in the Bahamas, 1925-33", Immigrants and Minorities, 5 (1): 5–27, doi:10.1080/02619288.1986.9974620
- Kourvetaris, George A. (1997), "The Bahamian Greek Community: Past, Present, And Future", Studies on Greek Americans, East European Monographs #470, Columbia University, pp. 247–255, ISBN 978-0-88033-377-1
