= Étienne Dupuch =

Bahamian journalist and politician

Sir Étienne Dupuch, OBE, KSG
- Born: Alfred Étienne Jérôme Dupuch; 16 February 1899; Colony of the Bahamas
- Died: 23 August 1991; Nassau, Bahamas

Sir Alfred Étienne Jérôme Dupuch, OBE, KSG (16 February 1899 – 23 August 1991) was a Bahamian journalist and politician.

He was editor of The Nassau Tribune from 1919 to 1973 and served in the Bahamian House of Assembly for 24 years.

Dupuch was named as the 'longest serving newspaper editor' by the Guinness Book of World Records.

== Early life ==
He was born Alfred Etienne Jerome Dupuch to Leon and Harriet (née Saunders) Dupuch.

Etienne's mother died in 1909 giving birth to a stillborn daughter. Etienne's father, Leon, founder of the Tribune newspaper, died five years later in 1914 when young Dupuch was 15 years old.

== Military service ==
Dupuch enlisted in the West Indies Regiment, aged 17 and saw action in Egypt, Belgium, France and Italy.

== Political life ==
Dupuch served as a Member of Parliament in the Bahamian House of Assembly from 1925 to 1942 and from 1949 to 1956, as a Member of the Legislative Council from 1960-1964 and as Senator from 1964 to 1968.

In 1956, Dupuch, together with his younger brother Eugene, introduced the first comprehensive anti-discrimination legislation in the colony's history, to outlaw racial discrimination in hotels, restaurants and other public places at a time when the country's tourist industry was experiencing dramatic growth.

During his time in office, he was opposed to the nascent Progressive Liberal Party believing that Bahamians should pursue a middle way to resolve the political differences that existed at the time between blacks and whites.

== Newspaper career ==
Dupuch began his newspaper career as a boy by delivering the Tribune on roller-skates through Nassau's 'over the hill' ghetto areas. He took over the editorship after serving as a soldier in the British Army during the First World War.

=== Newspaper slogan ===
Dupuch kept faith with the slogan "Being Bound to Swear to the Dogmas of No Master" that had been used by his father, Leon Dupuch, when the latter launched The Tribune as a four-page newspaper in 1903.

The slogan had been originally used in the Bahamas by John Wells, a loyalist who started the first Bahamian newspaper, The Gazette and whose descendant, Lisa Wells, founded the country's first news website, BahamasB2B.com, in 2000.

=== Editorials ===
Dupuch was known for strong editorials on his political positions.

For years, Dupuch was at odds with Nassau's ruling white élite, the Bay Street Boys, and called out the Duke of Windsor during his five-year rule (1940-1945) as Governor of the Bahamas during the Second World War.

While Dupuch served as editor, the newspaper published a book in 1959 on the unsolved 1943 murder of Sir Harry Oakes.

Dupuch's powerful editorials were required reading among discerning Bahamians for many decades.

=== Legacy and retirement ===
Many prominent Bahamian journalists learned their craft under his tutelage, including Sir Arthur Foulkes, former Governor-General of the Bahamas from 2012 to 2014.

In the late 1960s, when he retired from the Senate, Dupuch was described by a fellow Senator, Doris Johnson, as "a pesky pimple on the body politic of the Bahamas", a quote he insisted on using in the Tribune's headline the following day.

Dupuch published a 1967 book, The Tribune Story, about his struggle to keep his paper afloat in the face of enormous odds.

In 1972, aged 73, Dupuch handed control of the Tribune to his daughter Eileen, a qualified barrister and graduate of Columbia University journalism school, who remains its publisher to the present day.

Among Dupuch's other protégés were Oswald Brown, who went on to become managing editor of both The Nassau Guardian and The Freeport News, and John Marquis, the award-winning British journalist who worked as a political reporter on both The Nassau Guardian and The Tribune in the 1960s, and returned to the Bahamas in 1999 as the Tribune's Managing Editor.

During Marquis's ten years as Managing Editor, the Tribune enjoyed a dramatic surge in circulation. It also became embroiled in a string of controversies. Its exposure of a scandal involving the American cover girl Anna Nicole Smith was blamed for the fall of the Progressive Liberal Party government in 2007. Like Dupuch before him, Marquis was targeted by mass street protests outside the Tribune's offices.

Dupuch was listed among the three greatest Bahamians of the 20th century in a millennium poll in the year 2000.

== Honour and awards ==
Dupuch was appointed a Member of the Order of the British Empire (OBE) in 1949 and was knighted by Queen Elizabeth II in 1965.

He also received a papal knighthood from Pope Pius XII (Order of St Gregory the Great).

In 1988, he was recognised by St John's University with the Alumni Achievement Award.

== Death ==
Dupuch died on 23 August 1991, aged 92, after catching on fire in the garden of his home in Camperdown, Nassau, Bahamas while trying to destroy an ants' nest.
