= Watermelon spoiling on the vine =

Bahamian folksong

Watermelon spoiling on the vine is a Bahamian folksong, the recording was done by Americans Alan Lomax and Mary Elizabeth Barnicle and sung by a Black Bahamian with a banjo on New Bight, Cat Island, Bahamas in 1935. The song has also been recorded by "Blind Blake And The Royal Victoria Hotel Calypsos" in 1951 on the album A Group Of Bahamian Songs.
