= Squatting in the Bahamas =

The Bahamas marked on the globe

After the 1833 Slavery Abolition Act, many former slaves squatted privately owned land in the Bahamas and it was established juridically that 20 years of adverse possession would result in gaining ownership (on Crown land it was 60 years).

In the 21st century, undocumented migrants can be de facto squatters, tricked into paying rent to criminals posing as the owner, and the state will often evict these squatters. On the other hand, if the squatters are Bahamian nationals, the state will attempt to house them, helping them financially. As of 2004, the government had no means of assessing exactly how much squatting was occurring across the island country.

In 2022, the National Security Minister Wayne Munroe said that the state wanted to help squatters who were Bahamian nationals, but not if they were squatting on Crown land.
