= List of airlines of the Bahamas =

This is a list of airlines which have an air operator's certificate issued by the Civil Aviation Authority of Bahamas.

Airline	IATA	ICAO	Image	Callsign	Commenced operations	Notes
Air Charter Bahamas						
Air Flamingo						
Air Flight Charters		KFLL			1987	
Bahamasair	UP	BHS		BAHAMAS	1973	National airline (flag carrier)
Flamingo Air		FMR		FLAMINGO AIR	1971	AOC is actively suspended due to the July 10, 2026 incidents.
Golden Wings Charters					2002	
Pineapple Air		PNP		PINEAPPLE AIR	2003	
Southern Air Charter	PL	SOA		SOUTH AIRCHARTER	2000	
Western Air	WT	WST		WESTERN	2001	

== See also ==
- List of defunct airlines of the Bahamas
- List of airports in the Bahamas
