= Sandy Point Airport =

- IATA: none; ICAO: MYAS

Summary
- Airport type: Public
- Serves: Sandy Point, Abaco Island, Bahamas
- Elevation AMSL: 8 ft / 2 m
- Coordinates: 26°00′17″N 077°23′44″W

Map
- Location in The Bahamas

Runways
Direction	Length		Surface
Direction	m	ft	Surface
10/28	1,372	4,501	Asphalt
- Source: DAFIF

Sandy Point Airport (ICAO: MYAS) is an airstrip serving Sandy Point on Abaco Island in The Bahamas.

== Facilities ==
The airport resides at an elevation of 8 ft (2.4 m) above mean sea level. It has one runway designated 10/28 with an asphalt surface measuring 1,372 m × 30 m (4,501 ft × 98 ft).
