= Coakley Cay =

Island in the Bahamas

- Location within Bahamas
- Coordinates: 23°26′31″N 76°0′33″W
- Country: Bahamas
- Island: Exuma

Area
  - Total: 0,014 km^{2} (5.4 sq mi)
- Time zone: UTC−5 (EST)
  - Summer (DST): UTC−4 (EDT)
- Area code: 242

Coakley Cay in the Exuma Islands of the Bahamas is an 340 acres (140 ha) cay, located west of Great Exuma.
