= Spanish Cay Airport =

- IATA: none; ICAO: MYAX

Summary
- Airport type: Public
- Owner: Spanish Cay Government Household
- Operator: Spanish Cay island Services
- Serves: Spanish Cay, Abaco Islands, Bahamas
- Location: Spanish Cay
- Elevation AMSL: 10 ft / 3 m
- Coordinates: 26°57′01″N 077°32′38″W
- Website: www.spanishcay.com/airstrip.htm

Map
- Location in The Bahamas

Runways
Direction	Length		Surface
Direction	m	ft	Surface
14/32	1,342	4,403	Asphalt
- Source: DAFIF

Spanish Cay Airport (ICAO: MYAX) is an airstrip serving Spanish Cay, one of the Abaco Islands in The Bahamas.

== Facilities ==
The airport resides at an elevation of 10 ft (3.0 m) above mean sea level. It has one runway designated 14/32 with an asphalt surface measuring 1,342 m × 21 m (4,403 ft × 69 ft).
