= Jewfish Cay =

Island of the Bahamas

- Location within Bahamas

Geography
- Location: Atlantic Ocean
- Coordinates: 23°27′30″N 75°56′30″W
- Type: Cay
- Archipelago: Lucayan Archipelago

Administration
- Bahamas

Jewfish Cay, also known as Hummingbird Cay, is an island of the Bahamas, located in the Exuma district near Culmer's Cay and Bowe Cay. The island is host to an anchorage. The island is privately owned, and is also home to a marine biology research station connected to Tufts University.
