= Bahamian Rhyming Spiritual =

Music genre

- Stylistic origins: Spirituals
- Cultural origins: Afro-Bahamians
- Typical instruments: Vocals
- Derivative forms: gospel music

Bahamian rhyming spiritual is a religious genre of music found in the Bahamas, and also the songs, usually spirituals, and vocal-style within that genre. Rhyming does not refer to rhyme but to verse, the rhymer, or lead-singer, singing the couplets of the verses against the sung background of the repeated chorus. Rhyming was most popular during the sponge fishing of the 1930s (the sponges having been killed by a fungus), and Peter Elliot is considered the best rhymer.

Generally songs are structured verse-chorus-verse form, where the chorus is the goal of the verse, but in a rhyming spiritual the chorus becomes the accompaniment to the verse. The verse progresses over the chorus and eventually coincides, often with the rhymer dropping out for the last few words of the chorus. Usually there are three voices which make up the songs; the rhymer doing the melody, the bass which does a very low tone accompaniment, and the falsetto performing high pitches.

== Discography ==
- The Real Bahamas in Music and Song (1996/2003), recorded by Peter K. Siegel and Jody Stecher in 1965. Nonesuch Explorer Series: H-72013/79725-2.
- The Real Bahamas, Volume II (1978/2003), recorded by Peter K. Siegel and Jody Stecher in 1965. Nonesuch Explorer Series: H-72078/79733-2.
