= Anna Cay =

Small cay in The Bahamas

- Location within Bahamas

Geography
- Location: Atlantic Ocean
- Coordinates: 26°33′00″N 76°57′39″W
- Type: Cay
- Archipelago: Lucayan Archipelago

Administration
- Bahamas

Anna's Cay is a small cay in the Abaco chain of the Bahamas. It resides at the entrance to the North End public dock on Elbow Cay near Hopetown. The cay is home to one residence which is colored pink.
