= List of newspapers in the Bahamas =

Map of The Bahamas

This is a list of newspapers in the Bahamas.

== Newspapers ==
- Abaconian, Marsh Harbour, Abaco
- The Bahama Journal: Nassau, New Providence
- Bahamas National
- Bahamas News Ma Bey, founded in 2009, headquarters located in Orlando, Florida
- Bahamas Press
- Bahamas Spectator
- Bahamas Uncensored
- The Bahamas Weekly
- Eleutheran, Eleuthera
- The Freeport News: Freeport, Grand Bahama Island
- The Nassau Guardian: Nassau, New Providence
- Official Gazette The Bahamas, founded in 1783, official newspaper of the Bahamas' government
- The Punch: Nassau, New Providence
- The Tribune: Nassau, New Providence

== See also ==
- Television in the Bahamas
