= Ardastra Gardens, Zoo and Conservation Centre =

Ardastra Gardens, Zoo and Conservation Center
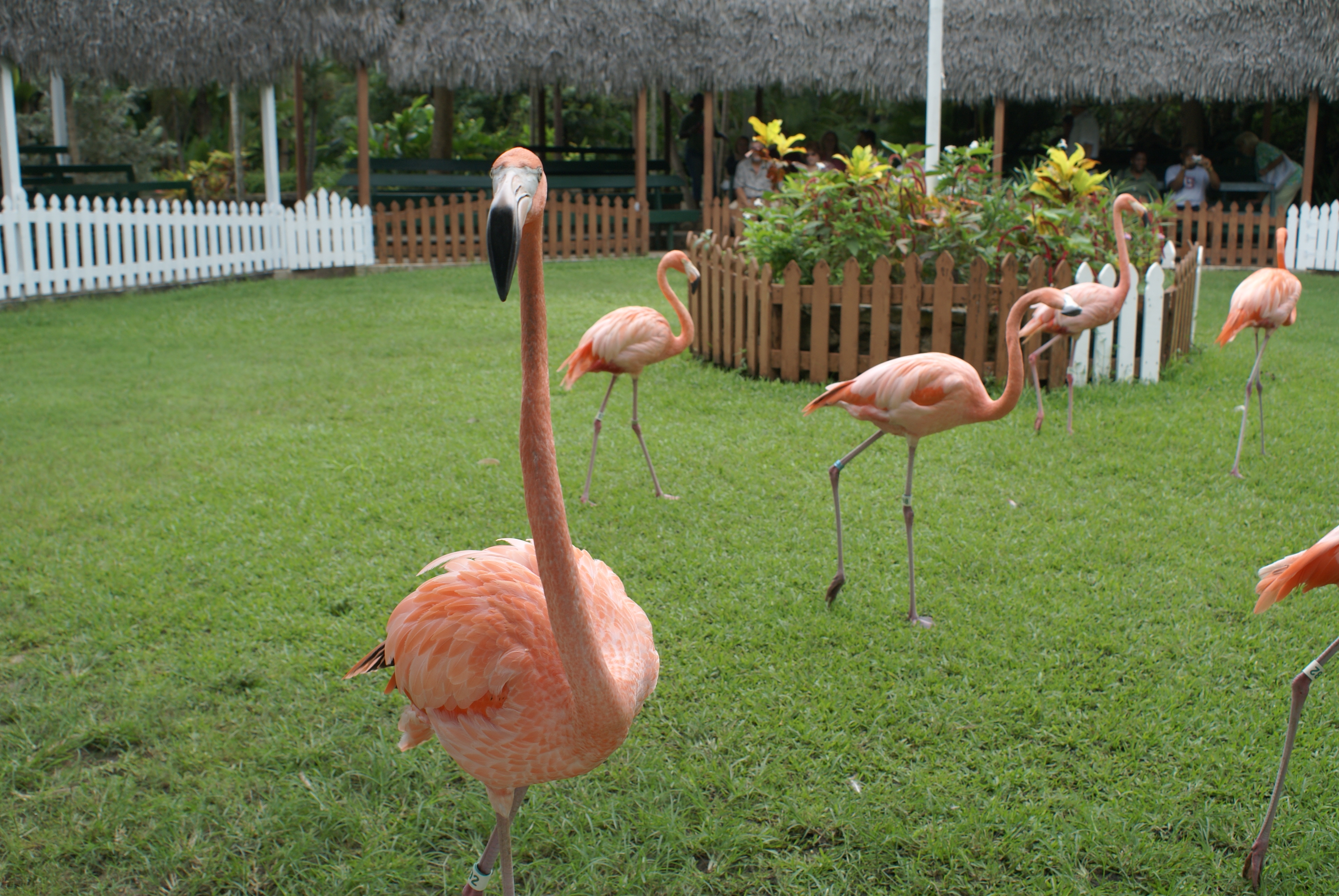
- Flamingos at the display
- Interactive map of Ardastra Gardens, Zoo and Conservation Center
- 25.0759°N 77.3617°W
- Date opened: 1982 (open since 1937 as gardens)
- Location: Nassau, The Bahamas
- No. of animals: about 200
- Website: www.ardastra.com

Ardastra Gardens, Zoo and Conservation Centre in Nassau, The Bahamas opened in 1937 though the work of the Jamaican horticulturist, Hedley Vivian Edwards.

Its name is derived from the Latin Ardua astrum, meaning "Striving for the stars".

In the 1950s, the Bahamian government brought flamingoes with the intention of breeding, as they had become rare there. In 1982 the gardens were bought by the Bahamian citizen Norman Solomon, who started the first Bahamian zoo. Best known for its flamingos, the zoo now has about 200 animals.
