= Troy Pinder =

Bahamian footballer (born 1997)

Personal information
- Full name: Troy Milton Pinder
- Date of birth: 30 October 1997 (age 29)
- Place of birth: Freeport, Bahamas
- Height: 1.77 m (5 ft 10 in)
- Position: Center-back

Team information
- Current team: Western Warriors SC

Senior career*
Years	Team	Apps	(Gls)
2017–	Western Warriors SC		

International career^{‡}
2018–	Bahamas	3	(0)
- * Club domestic league appearances and goals as of 12 January 2019 ‡ National team caps and goals as of 12 January 2019

Troy Milton Pinder (born 30 October 1997) is a Bahamian footballer who plays for Western Warriors SC and the Bahamas national team.

== International career ==
In May 2018, Pinder was called up for CONCACAF Nations League qualifying matches against Belize, Antigua and Barbuda, and Anguilla. Pinder made his senior international debut on 7 September 2018, playing all ninety minutes of a 4–0 away defeat to Belize.
