= Bahamas Crisis Centre =

Bahamian domestic abuse aid organization

The Bahamas Crisis Centre
- Formation: 1982
- Type: private
- Legal status: non-profit
- Purpose: aid victims of abuse
- Location: Nassau, New Providence, Bahamas
- Founder: Dr. Sandra Dean-Patterson
- Parent organization: Psychiatric Social Work Department, Community Mental Health Centre, Lyford Cay Foundation
- Affiliations: Family Violence Unit of Health Social Services
- Website: https://www.bahamascrisiscentre.com/

The Bahamas Crisis Centre is a private, non-profit organization located in Nassau, New Providence, Bahamas that is dedicated to treating victims of physical, sexual, and emotional abuse.

== History ==
The Bahamas Crisis Centre was founded by Dr. Sandra Dean-Patterson in 1982 with the assistance of several people. It was originally called the Women's Crisis Centre and was initially created to address the increasing need to provide intervention and preventative treatment and advocacy to women and children who were victims of domestic and/or sexual violence. The Centre has grown to address issues affecting men and victims of physical, sexual and emotional abuse in any form. It is maintained through the contributions of volunteers and a paid administrator.

The Women's Crisis Centre was co-sponsored by the Psychiatric Social Work Department and the Community Mental Health Centre and was given a single room in the Community Mental Health Centre, Knowles House adjacent to Princess Margaret Hospital in 1982. In this facility, clients had the opportunity to attend afternoon sessions twice a week and an evening clinic once a week. The free services provided both then and now include marital therapy, family therapy, walk-in crisis counseling, support groups and legal advice

After the Centre initially opened on a six-month trial period, the project was permanently extended, and, in 1988, the Lyford Cay Foundation donated funds to provide extra office space at the Knowles House, office supplies and educational materials.

In 1995, at the behest of the volunteers, the Women's Crisis Centre officially changed its name to the Crisis Centre. This was done to reflect the need to include men in the process of eliminating violence against women and children. It also acknowledged the fact that both men and boys were coming to the Crisis Centre either as victims of domestic and/or sexual violence or as aggressors with the desire to end their abusive behavior. The name change also initiated a change in the overall focus of the Crisis Centre. Volunteers began directing part of their attention towards preventative strategies, with the hope of addressing violence in the youthful population so that there are less cases of violence in adults.

== Volunteers ==
The Crisis Centre is primarily run through the efforts of volunteers. The first members of the Centre were social workers, psychiatrists and counselors who offered their services through the Crisis Centre on a voluntary basis. As the Centre became further established, the number of persons wanting to volunteer increased and it became necessary to train these volunteers to handle the specific, sensitive issues of rape survival, domestic violence survival, child abuse, depression, STDs, etc. A volunteer training program was implemented, and as of 2002 the Crisis Centre has trained over 500 volunteers.

The volunteers run a 24-hour crisis hotline, rape advocacy, court watch, educational outreach programs, and Crisis Centre Month. The volunteers meet once a month to achieve these goals.

== Legislation ==
Due to the awareness raising efforts of the Women's Crisis Centre, key pieces of legislature were passed that give women and children more legal rights and power with regards to abusive situations. The first legislation passed was the Domestic Violence and Sexual Offenders Act of 1991. This act included a much broader definition of rape and was not excluded to the previous definition which was vaginal penetration by a penis. It also mandated family members, guardians, nurses, doctors, teachers, and employers to report cases of suspected molestation and other forms of sexual violence for minors. The complete Act can be found here

The second legislation, which passed quite easily due to the efforts of the Crisis Centre, was the Child Protection Act of 2006. This Act outlines the rights of children and the penalties for those who break these rights. For more details look here

The most recent act, the Domestic Violence (Protection Orders) Act of March 2007, includes teenagers and adults in common-law marriages and in visiting relationships under the Domestic Violence and Sexual Offenders Act of 1991.

The Crisis Centre has also impacted other institutions in the Bahamas, such as the use of rape kits in the local hospitals, two-way mirrors in the police stations, video recordings of case hearings for sexually abused children in court, and the establishment of a sexual assault room at the Princess Margaret Hospital.

== Recognitions ==
The Crisis Centre has been acknowledged by several organizations for its effort to help women, men, and children in violent and/or abusive situations. In 1994, the Ministry of Housing and Social Services recognized the work of the Centre and added it to their list of charities. In 1997, the Crisis Centre was recognized as a model of excellence in Women's Health Care by the Commonwealth Health Secretariat. In 1998, the Crisis Centre was granted consultative status at the United Nations. It was the first Bahamian organization to be accredited such a position.
