= Public Hospitals Authority =

Healthcare in the Bahamas

The Public Hospitals Authority is responsible for managing public hospitals and other health-related organizations in the Commonwealth of The Bahamas. It was created in July 1999 by the Public Hospitals Authority Act of the Parliament of the Bahamas. It is responsible for three hospitals: Princess Margaret Hospital, Sandilands Rehabilitation Centre, and Rand Memorial Hospital.

It is also responsible for managing the National Emergency Medical Services, the Bahamas National Drug Agency, the Materials Management Directorate, and the Community Health Services in Grand Bahama, which with the Rand Hospital constitute the Grand Bahama Health Services. It negotiates terms and conditions for the staff with the Bahamas Nurses' Union and the Medical Association of the Bahamas.

Its offices are in Centreville, New Providence.
