= Bahamas Hotel, Catering and Allied Workers Union =

- Abbreviation: BHC&AWU
- Location: The Bahamas
- Key people: Nicole Martin, president Darrin Woods, general secretary
- Website: bhcawu.com

Bahamas Hotel, Catering and Allied Workers Union is a trade union organizing employees in the tourism sector in The Bahamas.

Leadership:

- President: Darrin Woods
- 1st Vice President:
- General Secretary:

The union is affiliated to IUF.
