= Town & Country Predators =

Bahamanian football club

The Town and Country Predators is a football club in the Bahamas. They are a Grand Bahama Football League club currently in Lucaya, Bahamas.
