= Stocking Island =

Island in the Exuma region, Bahamas

- Location within Bahamas

Geography
- Location: Caribbean Sea
- Coordinates: 23°32′N 75°46′W
- Length: 3 mi (5 km)

Administration
- Bahamas

Demographics
- Population: 10

Stocking Island is a small, long, narrow island off the port of George Town, Great Exuma Island, The Bahamas. The island features beaches and several resorts.

== Location and geography ==
Stocking Island is lightly inhabited, with a population of only 10. It is located 1 mile (1.6 km) from Government Dock, George Town, across the harbor. The long narrow island protects George Town from ocean waves, creating a natural harbor. There is one high hill, known locally as the Beacon, which is capped with an old, unused gas beacon. The glass top portion is missing, but the concrete pillar is visible for miles. The central part of Stocking Island features an inlet known as Hurricane Hole where sailboats anchor for protection during storms, and which features a blue hole. Opposite Hurricane Hole is a sandbar beach called the Spit.

Nearby islands include Lilly Cay, Elizabeth Island, Guana Cay, and Fowl Cay.
