= Television in the Bahamas =

Television in the Bahamas was introduced in 1977, though television broadcasts had already been available from the United States for several decades. The television stations in the Bahamas include:

- ZNS-13, Nassau/Freeport
- JCN Channel 14
- Our TV
- Eyewitness News

== See also ==
- List of newspapers in the Bahamas
- List of the Caribbean television channels
