= Iron Cay =

Uninhabited island in Bahamas

- Location within Bahamas

Geography
- Location: Atlantic Ocean
- Coordinates: 26°25′N 77°02′W
- Type: Cay
- Archipelago: Lucayan Archipelago

Administration
- Bahamas

Iron Cay is an uninhabited cay of the Bahamas in the Central Abaco district.

It is home to the Bahaman anole.
