= Bahamas Electricity Corporation =

Government electricity provider in the Bahamas

- Founded: 1956
- Headquarters: The Bahamas

The Bahamas Electricity Corporation (BEC) is a government corporation that provides electricity to all of the Bahama Islands except for Grand Bahama. The corporation operates 30 generating plants in 25 island locations, with 100,000 customers and a peak capacity of 438 MW. Most of the stations use diesel engines; a large gas-turbine plant is installed at the Blue Hills Power Station.

== Bahamas Power and Light ==
The BEC has a subsidiary in Bahamas Power and Light (BPL), which serves customers in New Providence and the Family Islands. As of 2023, BPL provides 83% of the power, 535 megawatts, in the Bahamian grid.

== History ==
BEC was founded in 1956 by the passing of Electricity Act.
