= O'Brien Cay =

- Location within Bahamas

Geography
- Location: Atlantic Ocean
- Coordinates: 24°19′17″N 76°33′10″W
- Type: Cay
- Archipelago: Lucayan Archipelago

Administration
- Bahamas

O'Brien Cay is an island in the Bahamas located in the district of Exuma. It is rarely embarked upon, despite two active dive sites offshore—a small coral reef and the wreck of a seaplane. It is located near Bell Island and Soldier Cay and is 5.56 km long.
