= Official Gazette The Bahamas =

Official Gazette The Bahamas is the government gazette of The Bahamas. The Gazette is published in Nassau by the Cabinet Office under the provisions of Section 4 of the Interpretation and General Clauses Act. Wherever the word "Gazette" is used in Bahamian law, it refers to the Official Gazette of The Bahamas, or any Supplement or Extraordinary Gazette issued. The official gazette is published weekly but the other gazettes are issued as required. In law the word "Gazette" includes "any newspaper published and in general circulation in The Bahamas and designated as the Gazette by Order of the Governor General".

== History ==
The Official Gazette of the Bahamas was published by John Wells in 1783. John Wells was a loyalist, who brought the printing press to the Bahamas.
