= List of hospitals in the Bahamas =

This is a list of hospitals in the Bahamas.

- Doctors Hospital – Nassau, New Providence, 25.07524530821175°N 77.33302382076954°W
- Epcot Medical Center – Nassau, New Providence, 25.0665835246203°N 77.33544856108115°W
- Immuno-Augmentative Clinic – Freeport, City of Freeport
- Lyford Cay Hospital, Nassau, New Providence, 25.032329310901275°N 77.51342654758956°W
- Princess Margaret Hospital – Nassau, New Providence, 25.0745489095384°N 77.33656939193425°W
- Rand Memorial Hospital – Freeport, Freeport, 26.532345955051376°N 78.6928276053694°W
- Sandilands Psychiatric Hospital – Nassau, New Providence
- Sandilands Rehabilitation Centre – Nassau, New Providence, 25.030951392525882°N 77.29299859193596°W
- Sandy Port Royal Hospital (former Royal Sandy Port Institute for the Insane), Freeport, Freeport, 25.07670488417073°N 77.42710608194665°W
