= Spanish Wells =

St. George's Cay
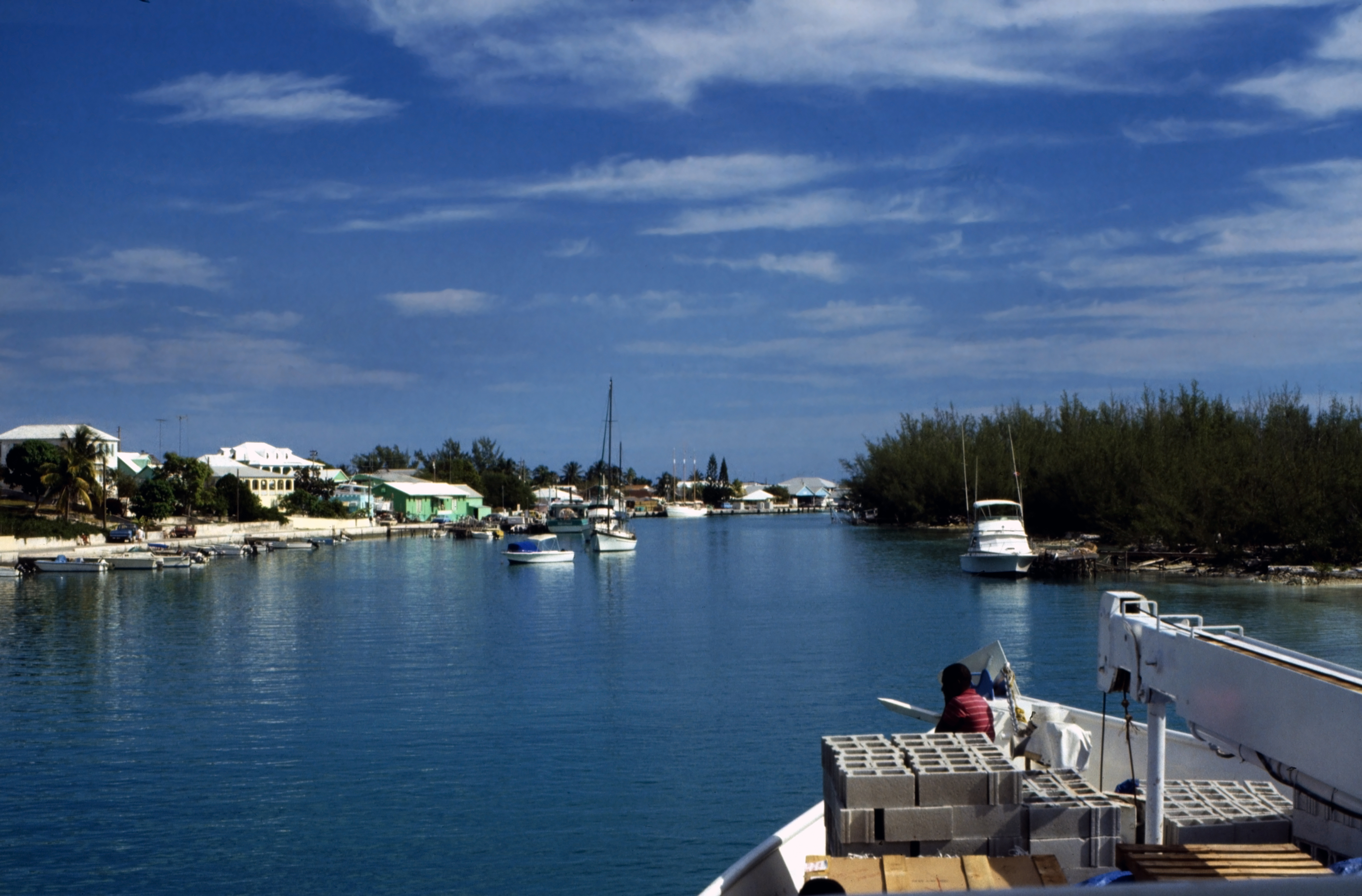

- Coordinates: 25°32′45″N 76°45′40″W
- Country: Bahamas
- Island: St. George's Cay
- Established: 1853

Government
  - Type: District Council
  - Chief Councillor: Robert Roberts
  - Deputy Chief Councillor: Kole Pinder

Population (2022)
  - Total: 1,608

Demographics 2010
  - White: 81.95%
  - Black: 15.48%
  - Black and white: 0.84%
  - Other: 0.97%
- Time zone: UTC−5 (EST)
  - Summer (DST): UTC−4 (EDT)
- Area code: 242

Spanish Wells is a district of the Bahamas. The settlement consists of a medium-sized town on the island of St. George's Cay 610 m (2,000 ft) wide by 2,860 m (9,380 ft) long, located approximately 500 m (1,600 ft) off the northern tip of Eleuthera island. According to the 2022 census, it has a population of 1,608 residents.

It is the only majority white district in The Bahamas.

== Overview ==
Spanish Wells is extended by a bridge that links it to neighboring Russell Island, which is 5.8 km (3.6 mi) long and has become an integral part of the community. Spanish Wells is so small that many residents get around the island using golf carts instead of full-sized cars. Spanish Wells is known for its white powdery beaches, tropical breezes, laid back atmospheres and friendly people.

=== History ===
Historically, the island was used as a last stop for the Spanish treasure fleet returning to Europe and the Iberian Peninsula. Spanish galleons and Spain's medieval ships refilled their water supply from wells created for this purpose - thus the English name of the settlement: Spanish Wells.

The first British colonists were the Eleutheran adventurers from Bermuda (intending to be some of the first settlers of Eleuthera), who suffered shipwreck on a reef, known as the "Devil's Backbone" off Eleuthera in 1647. After living in a cave known as "Preacher's Cave" on Eleuthera, they ended up at Spanish Wells. Among other, later, groups of settlers were Crown loyalists, who left the United States after the American Revolutionary War.

=== Economy ===
Spanish Wells has historically been a fishing village since its earliest inception. Although the economy used to share a heavier dependence on farming during its earlier years, almost equally split with its fishing arm, fishing has dominated the occupation from its origin until today. Fishing on Spanish Wells has also looked different in its method over the hundred years it has been practiced.

"Smack fishing", as it has been commonly known among the local inhabitants, has become the predominant form of Fishing. The term comes from a "smack," which refers to a larger craft voyaging out with additional dinghies, or as the locals call them, "speed boats". These trips can usually occur over a period of weeks at a time. Earlier voyages in the island's history would have been predominated by net fishing with a predominant method called "hauling." Over the years, especially with the invention and wide distribution of condos, smack trips have shifted from fish to rock lobster, of which the local name is "crawfish". This shift began to take place sometime in the 1980s and has had almost a complete transformation of the entire fishing fleet towards harvesting wild rock lobster.

With the rise of tourism in the early 2000s, the economy has also shared another major industry, tourism. This trend took on a larger form during the mid-2010s, and has provided a great revenue source mostly for retired lobster fishermen to nearby natural and manmade attractions.

=== Demographics ===
Spanish Wells is populated primarily by White Bahamians, who constitute 81.95% of the district's population. Afro-Bahamians constitute a further 15.48% of the population. As of the 2010 census, the district is home to 1,551 residents.

=== Tropical storms ===
The area suffered extensive property damage during a direct hit from Hurricane Andrew in 1992 and Floyd in 1999.

== Notable people ==
- Clay Sweeting, Member of Parliament and Cabinet Minister
