= Abaco Air =

Airline based in the Bahamas

Abaco Air Limited
IATA	ICAO	Call sign
—	Pending	ABACO AIR
- Ceased operations: January 8, 2013
- Operating bases: Marsh Harbour, Abaco Islands, Bahamas
- Website: http://www.flyabacoair.com

Abaco Air Limited was a scheduled and charter airline based in the Bahamas. Its main base was in Marsh Harbour, Abaco Islands, Bahamas. It ceased operations in 2013.

The airline was founded in 1975 and would operate the BN 2 Islander on charter services from Marsh Harbour in Abaco.
