= Lucayan people =

Indigenous inhabitants of the Bahamas

Lucayans
Total population
- Historical population: 40,000 (approximate)

Regions with significant populations
- The Bahamas, Turks and Caicos

Languages
- Lucayan

Religion
- Native American religions

Related ethnic groups
- Ciboney, Taínos

The Lucayan people (/luːˈkaɪən/ loo-KY-ən) were the Indigenous people of the Bahamas and the Turks and Caicos Islands before the European colonisation of the Americas. According to some scholars, including Julian Granberry and Gary Vescelius, they were a branch of the Taínos who inhabited most of the Caribbean and the Bahamas. Other scholars, including L. Antonio Curet and William F. Keegan, do not classify Lucayans as Taínos. The Lucayans were the first Indigenous Americans encountered by Christopher Columbus (in October 1492). Shortly after contact, the Spanish kidnapped and enslaved Lucayans with the displacement culminating in the complete eradication of the Lucayan people from the Bahamas by 1520.

The name "Lucayan" is an Anglicization of the Spanish Lucayos, itself a hispanicization derived from the Lucayan Lukku-Cairi, which the people used for themselves, meaning "people of the islands". The Lucayan word for "island", cairi, became cayo in Spanish and "cay" /ˈkiː/ in English [spelled "key" in American English].

Some crania and artifacts of "Ciboney type" were reportedly found on Andros Island, but if some Ciboney did reach the Bahamas ahead of the Lucayans, they left no known evidence of occupation. Some possible Ciboney archaeological sites have been found elsewhere in the Bahamas, but the only one subjected to radiocarbon dating dated to the mid- to late-12th century, contemporaneous with Lucayan presence on the islands.

Christopher Columbus's diario contains the only contemporaneous observations of the Lucayans. Other information about the customs of the Lucayans has come from archaeological investigations and comparison with what is known of Ciboney and Taíno cultures in Cuba and Hispaniola. The Lucayans were distinguished from the Taínos of Cuba and Hispaniola in the size of their houses, the organization and location of their villages, the resources they used, and the materials used in their pottery.

== Origin and settlement ==
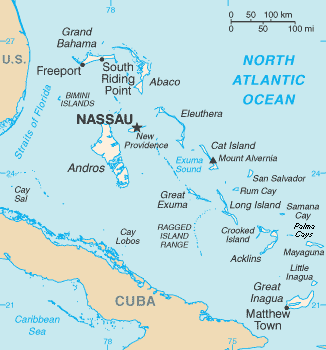
A map of The Bahamas, excluding the Turks and Caicos Islands, east of Great Inagua off the right edge of the map

Sometime between 500 and 800 CE, Taínos began crossing in dugout canoes from Hispaniola and/or Cuba to the Bahamas. Hypothesized routes for the earliest migrations have been from Hispaniola to the Caicos Islands, from Hispaniola or eastern Cuba to Great Inagua Island, and from central Cuba to Long Island in the central Bahamas. The settlement sites in the Caicos Islands differ from those found elsewhere in the Bahamas, resembling sites in Hispaniola associated with the Classic Taíno settlements that arose after 1200.

William Keegan argues that the sites on Caicos therefore represent a colonization after 1200 by Taínos from Hispaniola seeking salt from the natural salt pans on the island. Great Inagua is closer to both Hispaniola, at 90 kilometres (56 mi), and Cuba, at 80 kilometres (50 mi), than any other island in the Bahamas, and sites on Great Inagua contain large quantities of sand-tempered pottery imported from Cuba and/or Hispaniola, while sites on other islands in the Bahamas contain more shell-tempered pottery ("Palmetto Ware"), which developed in the Bahamas.

While trade in dugout canoes between Cuba and Long Island was reported by Columbus, this involved a voyage of at least 260 kilometres (160 mi) over open water, although much of that was on the very shallow waters of the Great Bahama Bank. The Taínos probably did not settle in central Cuba until after 1000, and there is no particular evidence that this was the route of the initial settlement of the Bahamas.

From an initial settlement of Great Inagua Island, the Lucayans expanded throughout the Bahamas Islands in some 800 years (c. 700 – c. 1500), growing to a population of about 40,000. Population density at the time of first European contact was highest in the south central area of the Bahamas, declining towards the north, reflecting the progressively shorter time of occupation of the northern islands. Known Lucayan settlement sites are confined to the nineteen largest islands in the archipelago, or to smaller cays located less than one kilometre from those islands.

Keegan posits a north-ward migration route from Great Inagua Island to Acklins and Crooked Islands, then on to Long Island. From Long Island expansion would have gone east to Rum Cay and San Salvador Island, north to Cat Island and west to Great and Little Exuma Islands. From Cat Island the expansion proceeded to Eleuthera, from which New Providence and Andros to the west and Great and Little Abaco Islands and Grand Bahama to the north were reached. Lucayan village sites are also known on Mayaguana, east of Acklins Island, and Samana Cay, north of Acklins.

There are village sites on East, Middle and North Caicos and on Providenciales, in the Caicos Islands, at least some of which Keegan attributes to a later settlement wave from Hispaniola. Population density in the southernmost Bahamas remained lower, probably due to the drier climate there, less than 800 millimetres (31 in) of rain a year on Great Inagua Island and the Turks and Caicos Islands and only slightly higher on Acklins and Crooked Islands and Mayaguana.

Based on Lucayan names for the islands, Granberry and Vescelius argue for two origins of settlement; one from Hispaniola to the Turks and Caicos Islands through Mayaguana and Acklins and Crooked Islands to Long Island and the Great and Little Exuma Islands, and another from Cuba through Great Inagua Island, Little Inagua Island and Ragged Island to Long Island and the Exumas. Granberry and Vescelius also state that around 1200 the Turks and Caicos Islands were resettled from Hispaniola and were thereafter part of the Classical Taíno culture and language area, and no longer Lucayan.

== History ==
=== Classification and connections ===
Scholarly debate exists over whether the Lucayan people should be classified as Taino. Some scholars, including Julian Granberry and Gary Vescelius, classify the Lucayans as part of a larger Taíno population in the Greater Antilles. The Lucayans, along with the Taínos in Jamaica, most of Cuba and parts of western Hispaniola have been classified as part of a Sub-Taíno, Western Taíno or Ciboney Taíno cultural and language group. Keegan describes any distinctions between Lucayans and Classical Taínos of Hispaniola and eastern Cuba as largely arbitrary. The Lucayans lived in smaller political units, simple chiefdoms, compared to the more elaborate political structures in Hispaniola, and their language and culture showed differences, but they remained Taínos, although a "hinterland" of the wider Taíno world. The Lucayans were connected to a Caribbean-wide trade network. Columbus observed trade carried between Long Island and Cuba by dugout canoe. A piece of jadeite found on San Salvador Island appears to have originated in Guatemala, based on a trace element analysis. The archaeologist L. Antonio Curet has written that "early Spanish writers never used the proper noun (term) Taíno to refer to the Indians of the Greater Antilles, even when they created a “Taíno” concept of the good, noble Indian (De La Luz- Rodríguez 2011; Whitehead 2002) of the Greater Antilles to differentiate that Indian from the simpler Lucayos (from the Bahamian archipelago), and the more aggressive (savage) Caribes (from the Lesser Antilles)." Emily C. Kracht, Lindsay C. Bloch, and William F. Keegan of the Florida Museum of Natural History have written that they "avoid the term “Taíno” in describing peoples from the Caribbean as it is an umbrella term for the various cultural groups living there, though it does reflect the political and social ties between these groups over hundreds of years."

=== Appearance ===
Columbus thought the Lucayans resembled the Guanche of the Canary Islands, in part because they were intermediate in skin color between Europeans and Africans. He described the Lucayans as handsome, graceful, well-proportioned, gentle, generous and peaceful, and customarily going almost completely naked. Peter Martyr d'Anghiera said that the Lucayan women were so beautiful that men from "other countries" moved to the islands to be near them. Women past puberty wore a small skirt of cotton, and the men might wear a loincloth made of plaited leaves or cotton.

Some people wore head bands, waist bands, feathers, bones and ear and nose jewelry on occasion. They were often tattooed and usually applied paint to their bodies and/or faces. They also practiced head flattening. Their hair was black and straight, and they kept it cut short except for a few hairs in back which were never cut. Columbus reported seeing scars on the bodies of some of the men, which were explained to him as resulting from attempts by people from other islands to capture them.

=== 1492 Lucayan–Spanish encounter ===
In 1492 Christopher Columbus sailed from Spain with three ships, seeking a direct route to Asia. On October 12, 1492, he reached an island in the Bahamas, which was called Guanahani by the Lucayans, and later San Salvador by the Spanish. The identity of the first American landfall by Columbus remains contested, but many authors accept Samuel E. Morison's identification of what was later called Watling (or Watling's) Island as Columbus's San Salvador. The former Watling Island was officially renamed San Salvador in 1925. Luis Marden's identification of Samaná Key as Guanahani is the strongest contender with the former Watling Island theory. Columbus visited several other islands in the Bahamas hunting for gold before sailing on to Cuba.

Columbus spent a few days visiting other islands in the vicinity: Santa María de la Concepción, Fernandina, and Saomete. Lucayans on San Salvador had told Columbus that he could find a "king" who had a lot of gold at the village of Samaot, also spelled Samoet, Saomete or Saometo. Taíno chiefs and villages often shared a name. Keegan suggests that the confusion of spellings was due to grammatically differing forms of the name for the chief and for the village or island, or was simply due to Columbus's difficulty with the Lucayan language.

Columbus spent three days sailing back and forth along the shore of an island seeking Samaot. At one point he sought to reach Samaot by sailing eastward, but the water was too shallow, and he felt that sailing around the island was "a very long way". Keegan interprets this description to fit the Acklins/Crooked Islands group, with a ship in the west side being able to see the western shore of Acklins Island across the very shallow waters of the Bight of Acklins, where there was a village that stretched about 6 kilometres (3.7 mi) along the shore.

Amerigo Vespucci spent almost four months in the Bahamas in 1499 to 1500. His log of that time is vague, perhaps because he was trespassing on Columbus's discoveries, which at the time remained under Columbus. There may have been other unrecorded Spanish landfalls in the Bahamas, shipwrecks and slaving expeditions. Maps published between 1500 and 1508 appear to show details of the Bahamas, Cuba and the North American mainland that were not officially reported until later. European artifacts of the period have been found on San Salvador, the Caicos Islands, Long Island, Little Exuma, Acklins Island, Conception Island and Samaná Cay. Such finds, however, do not prove that Spaniards visited those islands, as trade among Lucayans could have distributed the artifacts.

=== Slavery and genocide ===
Columbus kidnapped several Lucayans on San Salvador and Santa María de la Concepción. Two fled, but Columbus took some Lucayans back to Spain at the end of his first voyage. Vespucci took 232 Lucayans to Spain as slaves in 1500. Spanish exploitation of the labor of the natives of Hispaniola rapidly reduced that population, leading the Governor of Hispaniola to complain to the Spanish crown. After Columbus's death, Ferdinand II of Aragon ordered in 1509 that Indians be imported from nearby islands to make up the population losses in Hispaniola, and the Spanish began capturing Lucayans in the Bahamas for use as laborers in Hispaniola.

At first the Lucayans sold for no more than four gold pesos in Hispaniola, but when it was realized that the Lucayans were practiced at diving for conchs, the price rose to 100 to 150 gold pesos and the Lucayans were sent to the Isle of Cubagua as pearl divers. Within two years the southern Bahamas were largely depopulated. The Spanish may have carried away as many as 40,000 Lucayans by 1513.

Carl O. Sauer described Ponce de León's 1513 expedition in which he encountered Florida as simply "an extension of slave hunting beyond the empty islands." When the Spanish decided to traffic the remaining Lucayans to Hispaniola in 1520, they could find only eleven in all of the Bahamas. Thereafter the Bahamas remained uninhabited for 130 years.

== Society ==
=== Genetics ===
In 2018, researchers successfully extracted DNA from a tooth found in a burial context in Preacher's Cave on Eleuthera Island. The tooth was directly dated to around 776–992 AD. Genetic analysis revealed that the tooth belonged to a woman. When compared against contemporary populations, the ancient individual shows closest genetic affinity to Arawakan speakers from the Amazon and Orinoco Basins, with closest affinity to the Palikur. The individual was assigned to mtDNA Haplogroup B2.

=== Customs ===
Lucayan society was based on descent through the mother's line, which was typical of Taíno culture as a whole. The Spanish reported that a woman resided with her husband's family, but Keegan argues that this was not patrilocal residence in the strict sense, but rather residence in the husband's uncle's household (avunculocal residence).

=== Houses ===
Lucayans, like other Taínos, lived in multi-household houses. Descriptions of Lucayan houses by the Spanish match those of houses used by Taínos in Hispaniola and Cuba: shaped like a round tent, tall, made of poles and thatch, with an opening at the top to let smoke out. Columbus described the houses of the Lucayans as clean and well-swept. The houses were furnished with cotton nets (some kind of hammocks) for beds and furnishings, and were used mainly for sleeping. Each house sheltered an extended family.

There are no surviving reports of the size of Lucayan houses, but estimates of about 20 people per house in Taíno communities in pre-contact Cuba are cited by Keegan as a reasonable estimate for Lucayan houses. While not mentioned for Lucayan houses, the houses in Cuba were described as having two doors. Classic Taíno villages in Hispaniola and eastern Cuba typically had houses arranged around a central plaza, and often located along rivers with access to good agricultural land. Lucayan villages were linear, along the coast, often on the leeward side of an island, but also found on the windward side wherever tidal creeks provided some protected shoreline.

=== Pre-European contact diet ===
The Lucayans grew root crops and hunted, fished and gathered wild foods. At least half of the diet came from plant foods.

The staple crop of the Lucayans was manioc (cassava), followed by sweet potato. Sweet manioc was eaten like sweet potato, by peeling and boiling. Bitter manioc, which has a dangerous amount of hydrogen cyanide, was prepared by peeling, grinding, and mashing. The mash was then filtered through a basket tube to remove the hydrogen cyanide as a poisonous juice. The filtered mash was dried and sieved for flour, which was used to make pancake-like bread cooked on a flat clay griddle. The poisonous hydrogen cyanide juice was boiled, which released the poison, and the liquid base mixed with chili peppers, vegetables, meat, and fish to make a slow-boiling stew that prevented the spoiling of its ingredients.

The Spanish also reported that the Lucayans grew sweet potatoes, cocoyams, arrowroot, leren, yampee, peanuts, beans and cucurbits. The Lucayans probably took most, if not all, of their crops with them to the Bahamas. The Lucayans may have grown papayas, pineapples, guava, mammee apple, guinep and tamarind fruit.

There were few land animals available in the Bahamas for hunting: hutias (Taíno utia), rock iguanas, small lizards, land crabs and birds. While Taínos kept dogs and Muscovy ducks, only dogs were reported by early observers, or found at Lucayan sites. Less than 12% of the meat eaten by Lucayans came from land animals, of which three-quarters came from iguanas and land crabs.

More than 80 percent of the meat in the Lucayan diet came from marine fishes, almost all of which grazed on seagrass and/or coral. Sea turtles and marine mammals (West Indian monk seal and porpoise) provided a very small portion of the meat in the Lucayan diet. The balance of dietary meat came from marine mollusks. The main meats were fishes and mollusks from the grass flat and patch reef habitats that are found between the beach and the barrier reef, and include parrotfish, grouper, snapper, bonefish, queen conch, urchins, nerites, chitons, and clams.

Maize was a recent introduction to the Greater Antilles when the Spanish arrived, and was only a minor component of the Taíno and, presumably, Lucayan diets.

=== Fiber and other plant products ===
The Lucayans grew cotton (Gossypium barbadense) and tobacco, and used other plants such as agave, furcraea and hibiscus for fiber in fishing nets. One of Columbus's sailors received 12 kilograms (26 lb) of cotton in trade from a single Lucayan on Guanahani. Although Columbus did not see tobacco in use by the Lucayans, he did note that they traded a type of leaf that they regarded as valuable. Bixa was used to produce a reddish body paint and jagua (Genipa or Mamoncillo) for black body paint.

=== Conch tools ===
Conch shells (pronounced as "konk", known as cobo in Taino) were a hard material in plentiful supply on the islands. They included several species of conch, including the queen conch and the Atlantic triton. Lucayans used them to make tools such as canoe gouges, hoes, hammers, picks, net mesh gauges, and fishhooks. They were also made into beads shaped like disks, carved into amulets, and used as inlay for sculptures.

Trumpet-like instruments that were played by blowing were also made of conch. A specific term, guamo, existed for trumpets made from the largest snail available, the Atlantic triton. These were used, similarly to church bells, to call people into action as well as for religious rites.

=== Other technology ===
The Lucayans carved canoes, spears, bowls and ceremonial stools from wood. Stone chopping, cutting and scraping tools were imported from Cuba or Haiti. Most pottery was of the type called "Palmetto Ware", including "Abaco Redware" and "Crooked Island Ware". This was produced in the islands using local red clay soils tempered with burnt conch shells (the red clay is derived from Saharan dust). Palmetto Ware pottery was usually undecorated. There are no known differences that can be used to date or sequence Palmetto Ware pottery. Some (usually less than one percent of collected sherds in most of the Bahamas, about ten percent in the Caicos Islands) sand-tempered pottery was imported from Cuba and/or Haiti. The Lucayans made fish hooks from bone or shell and harpoon points from bone. The Lucayans probably did not use bows and arrows. The first mention by the Spanish of encountering Indians using bows and arrows was at Samaná Bay in northeastern Hispaniola.

One of the few artifacts of Lucayan life that has been found in a variety of areas in the Bahama archipelago is the duho. Duhos are carved seats found in the houses of Taíno caciques or chiefs throughout the Caribbean region. Duhos "figured prominently in the maintenance of Taíno political and ideological systems . . . [and were] . . . literally seats of power, prestige, and ritual." Duhos made of wood and stone have both been found, though those made of wood tend not to last as well as the stone chairs and are, therefore, much rarer. There are intact wooden duhos in the collections of the Musée de l'Homme in Paris and British Museum in London (the latter found on the island of Eleuthera).

=== Religion ===
The Taino pantheon of cemís, also known as zemís, play an active role in the lives of humans, and distinguish between the cultural, pleasing human theme and the anti-cultural, nonhuman, foul theme. The term refers to both the spirits and the objects that represent spirits.

They include fruitfulness spirits Yocahu, the male giver of manioc, and Attabeira, the mother goddess. Attending to them were the twin spirits Maquetaurie Guayaba, the lord of the dead, and Guabancex, the mistress of the hurricane. The twin spirits were also attended to by sets of twins.

During arieto ceremonies, food was offered to the zemi, and shamans (behique) would give a piece of cassava bread to participants, which were kept preserved until the following year.

== See also ==
- List of Taínos
- Lucayan Archipelago
