= Out Islands =

Group of islands in The Bahamas

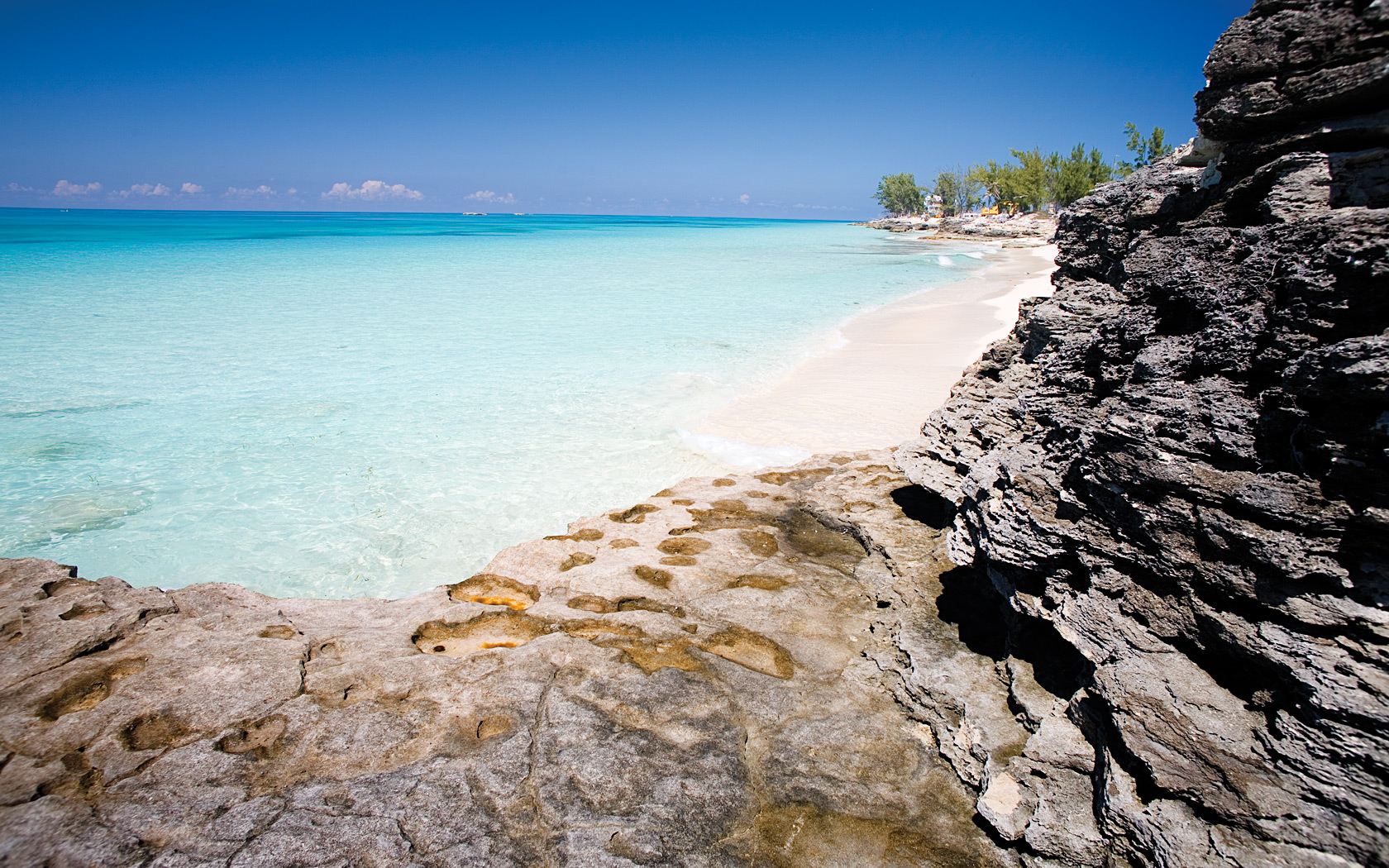
- Bimini Bay

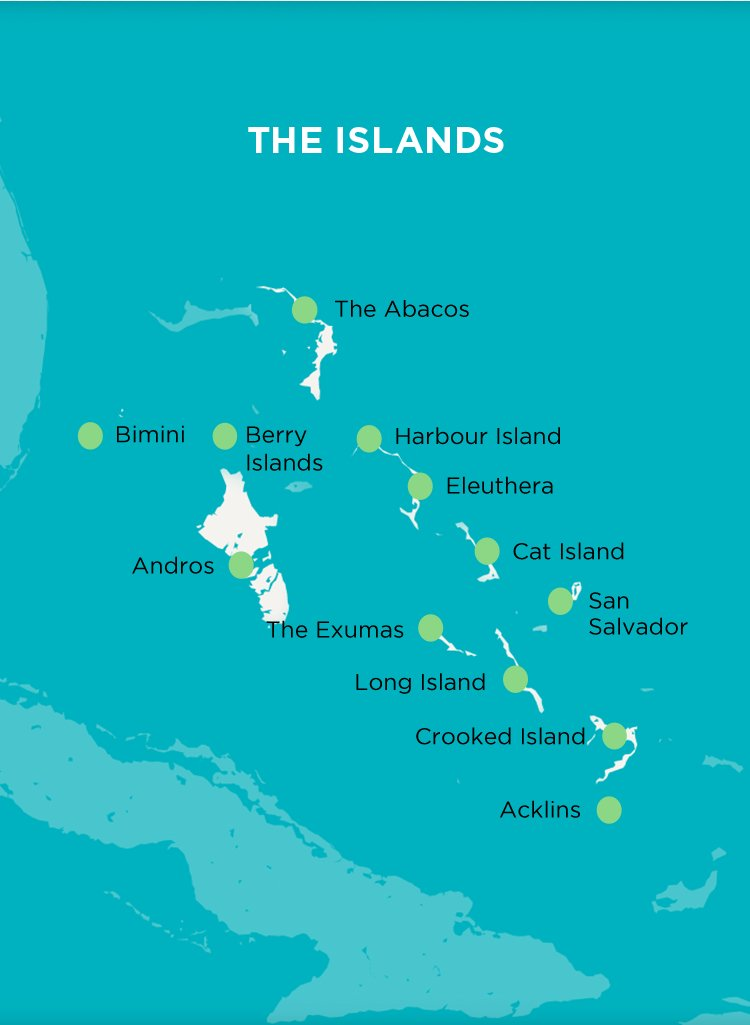

Geography
- Location: Caribbean
- Coordinates: 25.025885°N 78.035889°W

Administration
- Bahamas

The Out Islands are the islands of the Bahamas other than New Providence, which contains the capital and largest city, Nassau, and Grand Bahama, home to the city of Freeport. The Out Islands are also known as the Family Islands, a term adopted in the 1970s, and include island groups such as the Abaco Islands and Eleuthera. There are approximately 700 Out Islands, only a small number of which are inhabited.

== History and population ==
A History of the Bahamian People notes that even as Nassau became a more important port, "the majority of the Out Islands remained fixed in the Age of Sail well into the twentieth century." A significant number of American Loyalists fleeing from the Revolution migrated to the Bahamas (including the Out Islands), along with their slaves, profoundly influencing the islands' history.

Specifically, some 300 white families (owning an estimated 5,000 slaves) fled from East Florida to New Providence; among these, the majority of the whites stayed on New Providence, while two-thirds of the slaves went to the previously undeveloped Out Islands. A History of the Bahamian People notes that the Out Islands were historically "a miniature replica of Nassau's socialeconomic system based on race, differential wealth, and economic power" with some settlements being inhabited entirely by Afro-Bahamians, others by white Bahamians, and others by mixed communities generally dominated by whites.

In 1980, a Cuban MiG fighter jet attacked a Bahamian patrol boat, the HMBS Flamingo, in the Out Islands, killing four Bahamian marines. Survivors of the attack came ashore on Ragged Island. The Cuban government maintained that it had mistaken the ship for a pirate vessel. The incident greatly angered Bahamians, and Cuba later issued an apology and reparations.

== Economy and demographics ==
The Out Islands are more sparsely inhabited and less economically developed than New Providence and Grand Bahama. The most populous of the Out Islands are Abaco, Andros, and Eleuthera; the Out Islands tend to be less populous as one moves southward.

Poverty has historically been high in the Out Islands, given the small size of the islands and the lack of natural resources. In 2013, the Bahamas Department of Statistics reported a poverty rate of 17.16% in the Out Islands, compared to 12.58% in Nassau and 9.69% in Grand Bahama.

At the beginning of the 20th century, more than 75% of all Bahamians lived in the Out Islands; by the 1970s, two-thirds of all Bahamians lived in Nassau or elsewhere on New Providence Island. This dramatic population shift was related to a lack of stable job market in the Out Islands; only pineapple cultivation and salt-raking provided steady wage jobs, and only on a few islands. Today, tourism is economically significant in the Out Islands; beaches, snorkeling, and scuba diving are the principal tourist draws. A 2017 academic study reported that the relative economic importance of shark diving was greater in the Out Islands than elsewhere in the Bahamas.

== See also ==
- List of islands of the Bahamas

== Works cited ==
- Michael Craton & Gail Saunders, A History of the Bahamian People: From Aboriginal Times to the End of Slavery (Vol. 1: University of Georgia Press, 1992: paperback ed., 2009).
- Michael Craton & Gail Saunders, A History of the Bahamian People: From the Ending of Slavery to the Twenty-First Century (Vol. 2: University of Georgia Press, 1998: paperback ed., 2000).
