= Afro-Bahamians =

Bahamians of African descent

Afro-Bahamians (The Bahamas)
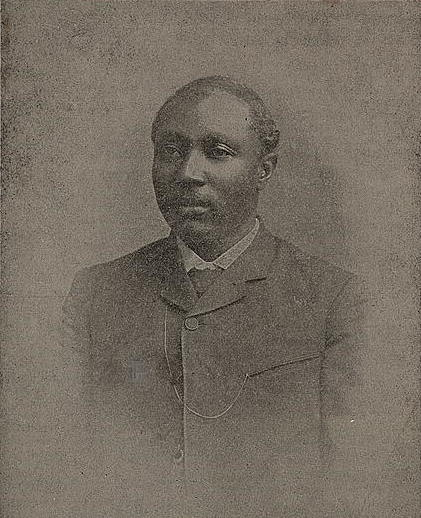
- Afro-Bahamian Pan-African leader, Joseph Robert Love

Total population
- c. 400,000

Regions with significant populations
- Bahamas circa 344,844 (2017); United States of America circa 55,000 (2015)

Languages
- Bahamian dialect, English

Religion
- Christianity, Santeria, Rastafari, Afro-American religions

Related ethnic groups
- Afro-Caribbean

Afro-Bahamians are an ethnicity originating in the Bahamas of predominantly or partial native African descent. They are descendants of various African ethnic groups, many associated with the Bight of Biafra, Ghana, Songhai and Mali, the various Fula kingdoms, the Oyo Empire, and the Kingdom of Kongo. According to the 2010 census, 92.7% of The Bahamas' population identifies as mixed African descent.

== Origins ==
Most Africans brought to The Bahamas were West African. Slaves came from West Central Africa (3,967 Africans), the Bight of Biafra (1,751 Africans), Sierra Leone (1,187 Africans), the Bight of Benin (1,044 Africans), the Windward Coast (1,030 Africans), Senegambia (806 Africans) and from the Gold Coast (484 Africans).

Afro-Bahamians originally came by way of Bermuda with the Eleutheran Adventurers in the 17th century. Many also came directly from Africa. During the 18th and 19th centuries, the Loyalists migrated to the Bahamas, bringing thousands of Africans with them from Georgia and South Carolina. Since the 19th century, many Afro-Haitians have settled in the southern Bahamas.

According to genetics, results indicate genetic signals emanating primarily from African and European sources, with the predominantly sub-Saharan African and Western European haplogroups E1b1a-M2 and R1b1b1-M269, respectively, accounting for greater than 75% of all Bahamian patrilineages. There are notable discrepancies among the six Bahamian populations in their distribution of these lineages, with E1b1a-M2 predominating Y-chromosomes in the collections from Abaco, Exuma, Eleuthera, Grand Bahama, and New Providence, whereas R1b1b1-M269 is found at elevated levels in the Long Island population. Substantial Y-STR haplotype variation within sub-haplogroups E1b1a7a-U174 and E1b1ba8-U175 (greater than any continental African collection) is also noted, possibly indicating genetic influences from a variety of West and Central African groups. Furthermore, differential European genetic contributions in each island (with the exception of Exuma) reflect settlement patterns of the British Loyalists subsequent to the American Revolution.

== History ==
Before the arrival of African slaves and European colonists, the Bahamas was initially inhabited by the Lucayan people. They later died of Spanish diseases after Christopher Columbus introduced pathogens to the island. Spain later ceded the island to Britain in accordance with the Treaty of Paris and then emancipation of slaves of African slaves began in 1834.

The earliest African inhabitants of the Bahamas came during the 1640s from Bermuda and England with the Eleutheran Adventurers, many were also brought from other parts of the West Indies.

In the 1780s after the American Revolutionary war, many British loyalists resettled in the Bahamas. This migration brought some 7000 people, the vast majority being African slaves from the Gullah people in Georgia and the Carolinas. Some Africans earned their freedoms and immigrated to the Bahamas by fighting for the British during the American Revolutionary War as members of the Ethiopian Regiment. This migration made the Bahamian population majority of African descent for the first time, with a proportion of 2 to 1 over the European inhabitants.

There was also an additional 9,560 people brought directly from Africa to the Bahamas from 1788 - 1807. 1807 was when the British abolished the slave trade.

Throughout the 19th century, close to 7000 Africans were resettled in the Bahamas after being freed from slave ships by the Royal Navy, which intercepted the trade, in the Bahamian islands. Slavery was abolished in the British Empire on 1 August 1834.

During the War of 1812, the British Cutter Privateer Caledonia was chiefly manned by Black Bahamians about 70 in number. No less than 8 Privateers left Nassau prior to September 1812, returning with 17 prizes in total, the Caledonia returned with 6 of the 17 prizes. The Naval War of 1812 Volume 1 Chapter 5 pg. 597 mentions that the Caledonia was "a British Privateer mounting but 8 guns and manned chiefly with Blacks, about 70 in number, cruising between Savannah and Charleston and has already done a great deal of mischief." The Caledonia operated out of Nassau.

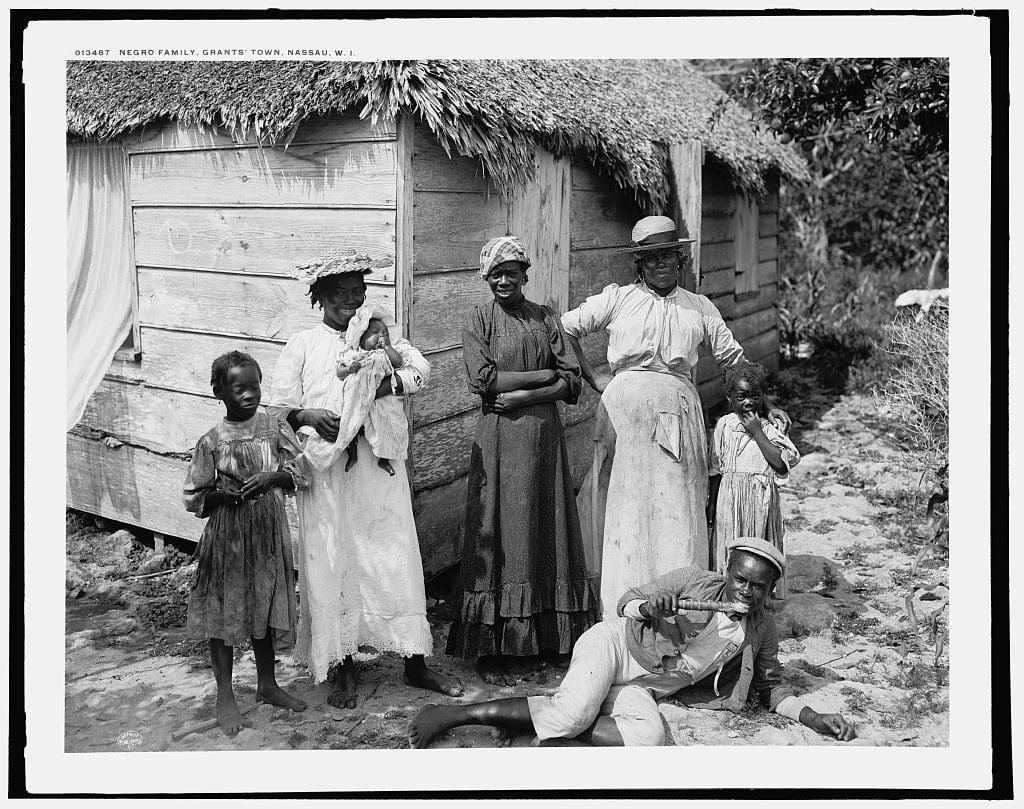
Afro-Bahamians in Nassau, circa 1900

In the 1820s, hundreds of African American slaves and Seminoles escaped from Cape Florida to the Bahamas, settling mostly on northwest Andros Island, where they developed the village of Red Bays. In 1823, 300 slaves escaped in a mass flight aided by Bahamians in 27 sloops, with others using canoes for the journey. This was commemorated in 2004 by a large sign at Bill Baggs Cape Florida State Park. Some of their descendants continue Seminole traditions in basket making and grave marking.

In 1818, the Home Office in London had ruled that "any slave brought to The Bahamas from outside the British West Indies would be manumitted." This led to a total of nearly 300 slaves owned by U.S. nationals being freed from 1830 to 1835. The American slave ships Comet and Encomium, used in its domestic coastwise slave trade, had wrecked off Abaco Island in December 1830 and February 1834, respectively. When wreckers took the masters, passengers, and slaves into Nassau, customs officers seized the slaves and British colonial officials freed them, over the protests of the Americans. There were 165 slaves on the Comet and 48 on the Encomium. Britain paid an indemnity to the US in those two cases.

British colonial officials also freed 78 American slaves from the Enterprise, which went into Bermuda in 1835; and 38 from the Hermosa, which wrecked off Abaco island in 1840, after abolition was effective in August 1834. The most notable case was that of the Creole in 1841, the Creole case was the result of a slave revolt whose leaders ordered the American brig to Nassau. It was carrying 135 slaves from Virginia destined for sale in New Orleans. The Bahamian officials freed the 128 slaves who chose to stay in the islands. The Creole mutiny has been described as the "most successful slave revolt in US history".

These incidents, in which a total of 447 slaves belonging to American nationals were freed by 1842, increased tension between the United States and Great Britain, although they had been cooperating in patrols to suppress the international slave trade. Worried about the stability of its domestic slave trade and its value, the US argued that Britain should not treat its domestic ships that came to its colonial ports under duress, as part of the international trade. The US worried that the success of the Creole's slaves in gaining freedom would encourage more slave revolts on merchant ships.

== Bahamian culture ==
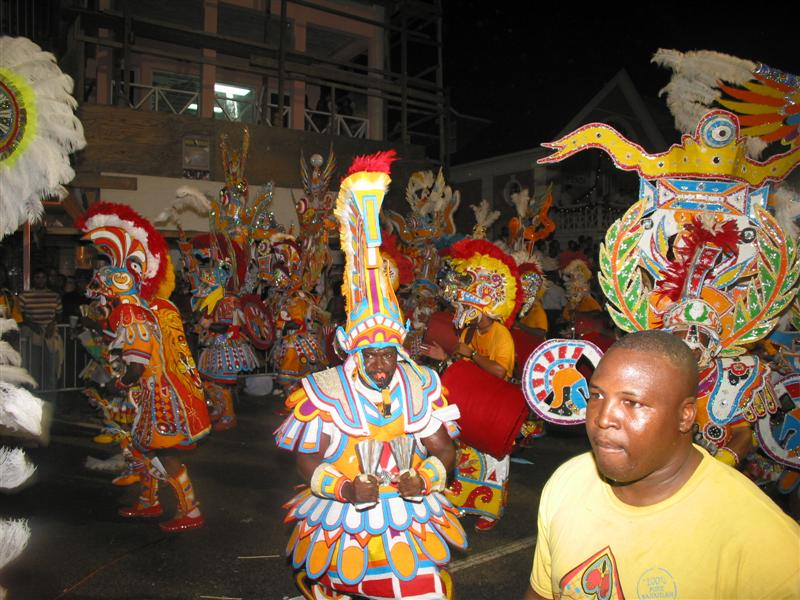
Junkanoo costumes

Junkanoo is a traditional Bahamian street parade of music, dance, and art held in Nassau every Boxing Day and New Year's Day. Junkanoo is also used to celebrate Emancipation Day.

Sloop Sailing Regatta - Is sailing using traditional Bahamian fishing boats for competition. It is presently being considered for National Sport of The Bahamas.

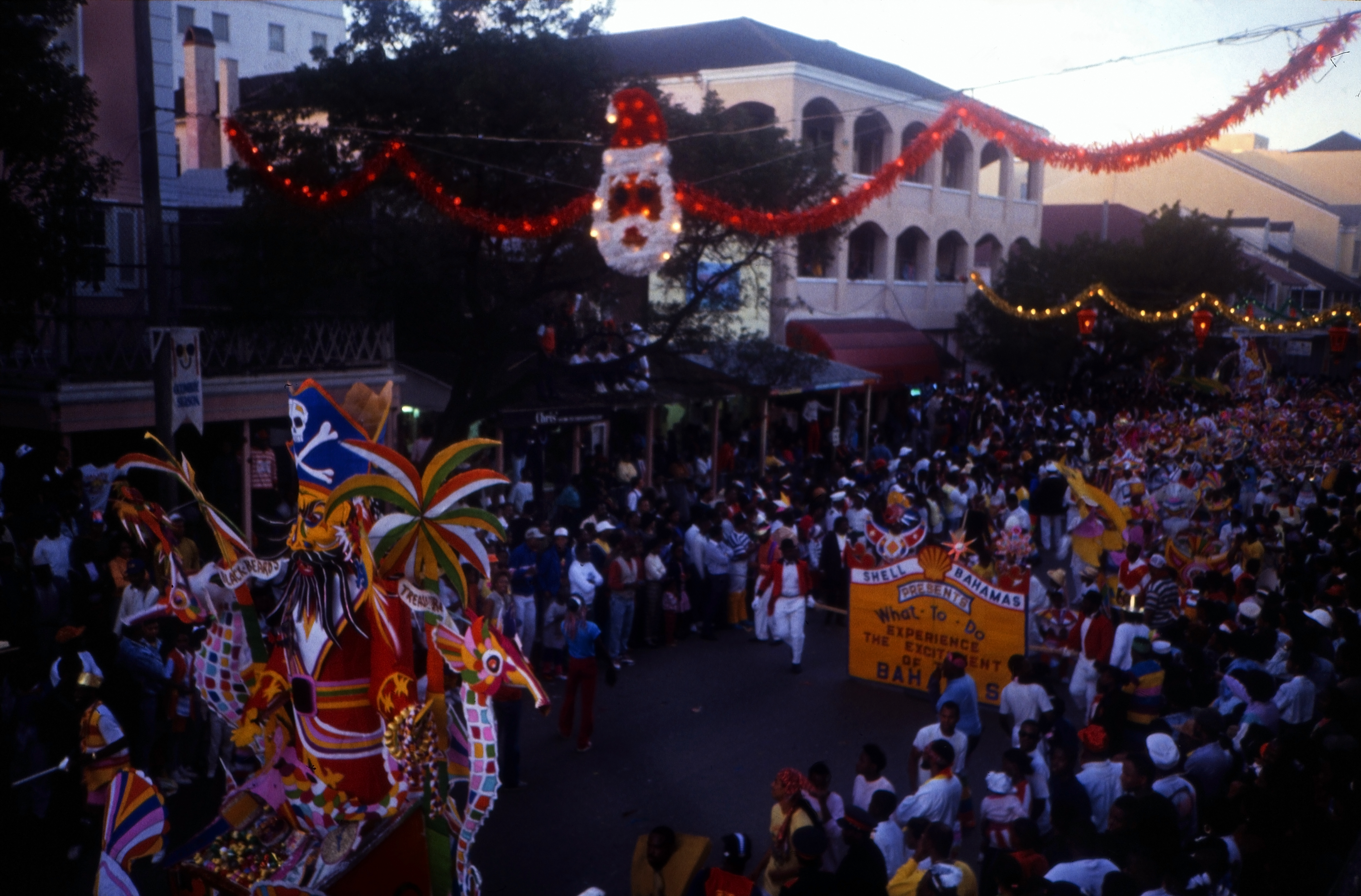
A Junkanoo celebration

=== Folklore ===
Obeah - Obeah is rarely practiced in the Bahamas, mainly within outer more rural islands and settlements. The practice of Obeah is, however, illegal and punishable by law.

Obeah is a common topic of conversation and pop-culture in the Bahamas:

- Various local songwriters reference Obeah in their music.
- If a person meets some kind of misfortune it is often jokingly blamed on "sperrits" or the devil.
- When a man is deeply in love with a woman, local Bahamians tease him saying his lover gave him "Coo-Coo Soup," a love-potion like soup.

Sperrits- A Bahamian take on spirits. Much akin to the spirits of Obeah and Voodoo. They are said to reside in graveyards at night and wander the bushes of the islands. They can be good or evil in nature and are blamed for both inconveniences and strokes of luck. Obeah-men are said to be able to both call upon and control sperrits.

Shigidi- is a spirit from among the Yoruba Orisha that controls nightmares and is the patron Orisha of Assassins. A book written by Alfred Burdon Ellis published in 1894 called The Yoruba-speaking Peoples of the Slave Coast of West Africa: Their Religion, Manners, Customs. He mentions that the Superstition of Shigidi still lingers among the negroes of The Bahamas of Yoruba descent, who talks of being hagged (cursed) and believe that nightmare is caused by a demon that crouches upon the breast of the sleeper.

Hags- are witch-like vampires that generally prey on good looking babies or women. They shed their skins when noticed and appear as floating candle-flames. They reside among the everyday inhabitants as humans.

== Major accomplishments ==
- Bert Williams was the first successful Bahamian actor on Broadway and comedian in The United States, opening the doors for future generations of black entertainers to find success in the American entertainment industry.
- Sidney Poitier became the first black man and Afro-Bahamian person to win an Academy Award for lead actor in The US.
- Shaunae Miller-Uibo became the first Bahamian to hold two world records in Athletics, 200m straight and the 300m indoor record.
- Pauline Davis-Thompson became the first Bahamian to win an individual Olympic gold medal at the 2000 Olympics following the disqualification of Marion Jones
- Allan Glaisyer Minns became the first mayor in Great Britain, being elected mayor of Thetford, Norfolk in 1904.
- Tonique Williams-Darling became the first Bahamian to win an Olympic 400m gold in 2004, she also became the first Bahamian woman to win a World Championship Gold in the 400m in 2005.
- Troy Kemp became the first Bahamian to win Gold at the World Championships in 1995. He won the High Jump.
- Mychal Thompson became the first foreign born player to be selected number 1 overall in the NBA draft in 1978.

== Notable Bahamians ==
- Al Roker
- Allan Glaisyer Minns
- Angela Palacious
- Antoan Richardson
- Bert Williams
- Bryan Michael Cox
- Buddy Hield
- Chandra Sturrup
- Debbie Ferguson-McKenzie
- DeAndre Ayton
- Esther Rolle
- Hilda Bowen
- Jeffery Gibson
- Johnny Kemp
- Lenny Kravitz
- James Weldon Johnson
- Jonquel Jones
- Joseph Robert Love
- Kimbo Slice
- Lynden Oscar Pindling
- Mychal Thompson
- Tia Mowry-Hardrict
- Tamera Mowry-Housley
- Myles Munroe
- Pauline Davis-Thompson
- Rick Fox
- Roxie Roker
- Savatheda Fynes
- Shaunae Miller-Uibo
- Sidney Poitier
- Steven Gardiner
- Tonique Williams-Darling
- Yves Edwards
- Trina
- Klay Thompson
- Troy Pinder
