= ISO 3166-2:BS =

Entry for the Bahamas in ISO 3166-2

ISO 3166-2:BS is the entry for the Bahamas in ISO 3166-2, part of the ISO 3166 standard published by the International Organization for Standardization (ISO), which defines codes for the names of the principal subdivisions (e.g., provinces or states) of all countries coded in ISO 3166-1.

Currently for the Bahamas, ISO 3166-2 codes are defined for one island (New Providence) and 31 districts.

Each code consists of two parts, separated by a hyphen. The first part is BS, the ISO 3166-1 alpha-2 code of the Bahamas. The second part is two letters.

== Current codes ==
Subdivision names are listed as in the ISO 3166-2 standard published by the ISO 3166 Maintenance Agency (ISO 3166/MA).

Click on the button in the header to sort each column.

Code	Subdivision name (en)	Subdivision category
BS-AK	Acklins	district
BS-BY	Berry Islands	district
BS-BI	Bimini	district
BS-BP	Black Point	district
BS-CI	Cat Island	district
BS-CO	Central Abaco	district
BS-CS	Central Andros	district
BS-CE	Central Eleuthera	district
BS-FP	City of Freeport	district
BS-CK	Crooked Island and Long Cay	district
BS-EG	East Grand Bahama	district
BS-EX	Exuma	district
BS-GC	Grand Cay	district
BS-HI	Harbour Island	district
BS-HT	Hope Town	district
BS-IN	Inagua	district
BS-LI	Long Island	district
BS-MC	Mangrove Cay	district
BS-MG	Mayaguana	district
BS-MI	Moore's Island	district
BS-NP	New Providence	island
BS-NO	North Abaco	district
BS-NS	North Andros	district
BS-NE	North Eleuthera	district
BS-RI	Ragged Island	district
BS-RC	Rum Cay	district
BS-SS	San Salvador	district
BS-SO	South Abaco	district
BS-SA	South Andros	district
BS-SE	South Eleuthera	district
BS-SW	Spanish Wells	district
BS-WG	West Grand Bahama	district

== Changes ==
The following changes to the entry have been announced in newsletters by the ISO 3166/MA since the first publication of ISO 3166-2 in 1998:

Newsletter	Date issued	Description of change in newsletter	Code/Subdivision change
Newsletter II-2	2010-06-30	Update of the administrative structure and of the list source	Subdivision layout: 21 districts (see below) → 32 districts (mistakenly listed as 31 districts in newsletter)
Newsletter II-3	2011-12-13 (corrected 2011-12-15)	Correction of NL II-2 for toponyms and typographical errors, one deletion and source list update.	Subdivisions deleted: BS-GT Green Turtle Cay
Online Browsing; Platform (OBP)	2018-11-26	Addition of island BS-NP; Addition of Remark; Update List Source	Subdivision added: BS-NP New Providence

=== Codes before Newsletter II-2 ===
Former code	Subdivision name (en)
BS-AC	Acklins and Crooked Islands
BS-BI	Bimini
BS-CI	Cat Island
BS-EX	Exuma
BS-FP	Freeport
BS-FC	Fresh Creek
BS-GH	Governor's Harbour
BS-GT	Green Turtle Cay
BS-HI	Harbour Island
BS-HR	High Rock
BS-IN	Inagua
BS-KB	Kemps Bay
BS-LI	Long Island
BS-MH	Marsh Harbour
BS-MG	Mayaguana
BS-NP	New Providence
BS-NB	Nicholls Town and Berry Islands
BS-RI	Ragged Island
BS-RS	Rock Sound
BS-SP	Sandy Point
BS-SR	San Salvador and Rum Cay

== See also ==
- Subdivisions of the Bahamas
- FIPS region codes of Bahamas
