= List of cities in the Bahamas =

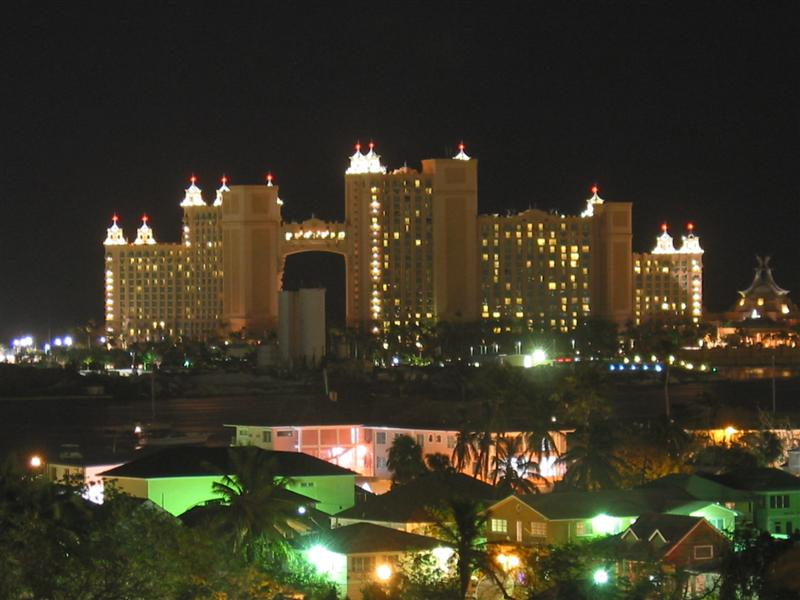
Nassau

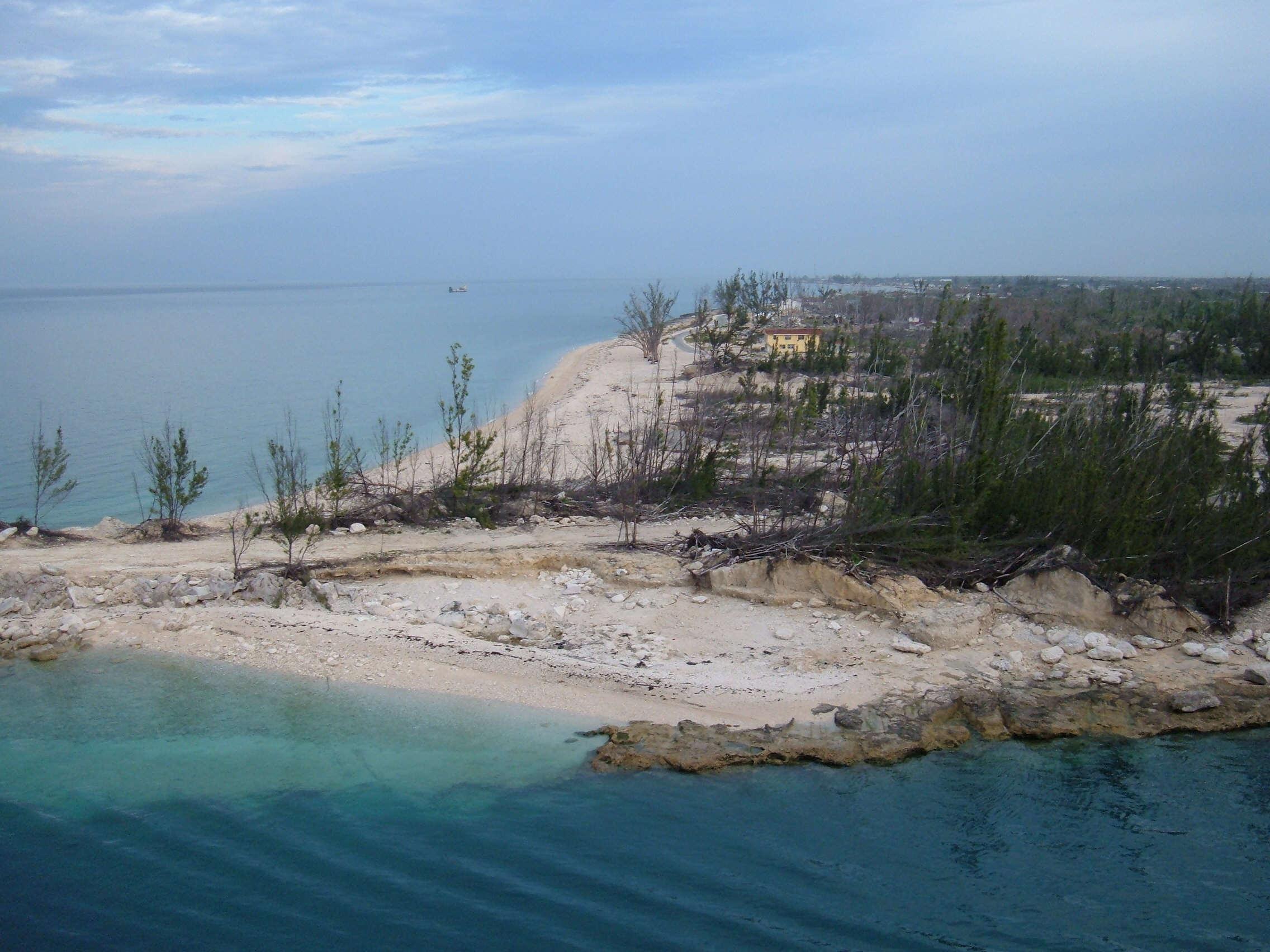
Freeport

This is a list of cities in the Bahamas.

== List ==
The following table lists the city or town name, the geographic coordinates, the population at the 1990 census, an estimate of the population in 2009, and the island name.

City/Town	Coordinates	Pop. 1990 (census)	Pop. 2009 (est.)	Island
Nassau	25.06°N 77.345°W	172,196	238,132	New Providence
Freeport	26.54°N 78.64°W	35,650	47,085	Grand Bahama
West End	26.69°N 78.97°W	10,535	13,004	Grand Bahama
Coopers Town	26.87°N 77.52°W	5,700	9,069	Abaco
Marsh Harbour	26.55°N 77.05°W	3,600	5,728	Abaco
Freetown	24.77°N 76.27°W	3,210	4,222	New Providence
Bahamas City	26.63°N 78.28°W	500	3,827	Grand Bahama
Andros Town	24.70°N 77.77°W	2,730	2,318	Andros
Clarence Town	23.10°N 74.98°W	1,740	1,705	Long Island
Dunmore Town	25.50°N 76.63°W	1,200	1,578	Eleuthera
Rock Sound	24.90°N 76.20°W	1,100	1,447	Eleuthera
Arthur's Town	24.66°N 75.73°W	1,350	1,216	Cat Island
Cockburn Town	24.03°N 74.52°W	300	1,045	San Salvador
George Town	23.52°N 75.78°W	1,080	1,038	Exuma and Cays
Alice Town	25.74°N 79.30°W	900	936	Biminis
Sweeting Cay	26.60°N 77.88°W	400	494	Grand Bahama
Matthew Town	20.96°N 73.68°W	470	435	Inagua Islands
Snug Corner	22.56°N 73.88°W	380	402	Acklins Island
Great Harbour Cay	25.76°N 77.85°W	320	383	Berry Islands
Nicholls Town	25.14°N 78.01°W	n/a	255	Andros
Colonel Hill	22.77°N 74.22°W	290	224	Crooked Island
Pirates Well	22.43°N 73.08°W	270	201	Mayaguana
Port Nelson	23.66°N 74.83°W	50	103	Rum Cay
Duncan Town	22.19°N 75.73°W	89	63	Ragged Island
Albert Town	22.60°N 74.35°W	30	23	Crooked Island

== Towns ==
- Adelaide Beach
- Alice Town
- Bailey Town
- Coral Harbour
- Dundas Town
- Marco City
- McLeans Town
- Porgy Bay

== See also ==
- Districts of the Bahamas
- Islands of the Bahamas
