= Miss Bahamas Universe 2018 =

- Date: September 16, 2018
- Venue: Imperial Ballroom in the Atlantis Resort, Paradise Island, The Bahamas
- Broadcaster: ZNS-TV
- Entrants: 20
- Placements: 10
- Winner: Danielle Grant; Eleuthera

The Miss Bahamas Universe 2018 pageant was held on September 16, 2018. This year only 20 candidates were competing for the national crown for Miss Universe. Danielle Grant represented Bahamas at the Miss Universe 2018. Grant succeeded predecessor, Yasmine Cooke of Nassau. The First Runner Up entered Miss Intercontinental and the Second Runner Up entered Miss Supranational. Contestant Samia McClain would also become Miss Earth Bahamas 2018.

== Final results ==
| Final results | Contestant |
|---|---|
| Miss Bahamas Universe 2018 | Eleuthera - Danielle Grant |
| 1st Runner-up | Long Island - Shauntae Miller |
| 2nd Runner-up | Capital City - Dimarcia Bethel |
| 3rd Runner-up | Abaco - Vernique Chandler |
| 4th Runner-up | Exuma - Selvanique Wright |
| Top 10 Semifinalist | Acklins - Ianthé Kellman; Berry Islands - Gabriela Collie; Bimini - Samia McClain; Harbour Island - Devyevette Nagee; Spanish Wells - Raven Hepburn |

=== Special awards ===
| Final results | Contestant |
|---|---|
| Miss Congeniality | Eleuthera - Danielle Grant |
| Miss Photogenic | Eleuthera - Danielle Grant |
| Best National Costume | Exuma - Selvanique Wright |

== Official delegates ==
| Represent | Contestant | Age | Height |
|---|---|---|---|
| Abaco | Vernique Chandler | 20 | 1.78 m (5 ft 10 in) |
| Acklins | Ianthé Kellman | 23 | 1.68 m (5 ft 6 in) |
| Andros | Naya Bathfields | 18 | 1.77 m (5 ft 9 1/2 in) |
| Berry Islands | Gabriela Collie | 21 | 1.69 m (5 ft 6 1/2 in) |
| Bimini | Samia McClain | 22 | 1.73 m (5 ft 8 in) |
| Capital City | Dimarcia Bethel | 24 | 1.77 m (5 ft 9 1/2 in) |
| Cat Island | Cynthia Williams | 19 | 1.83 m (6 ft 0 in) |
| Crooked Island | Tatiana Marines | 27 | 1.69 m (5 ft 6 1/2 in) |
| Eleuthera | Danielle Grant | 23 | 1.75 m (5 ft 9 in) |
| Exuma | Selvanique Wright | 23 | 1.79 m (5 ft 10 1/2 in) |
| Grand Bahama | Kendra Santos | 19 | 1.75 m (5 ft 9 in) |
| Harbour Island | Devyevette Nagee | 21 | 1.67 m (5 ft 5 1/2 in) |
| Inagua | Raychelle Foster | 18 | 1.71 m (5 ft 7 1/2 in) |
| Long Island | Shauntae Miller | 23 | 1.73 m (5 ft 8 in) |
| Mayaguana | Maya Andrews | 21 | 1.82 m (5 ft 11 1/2 in) |
| New Providence | La'Toya Adams | 21 | 1.75 m (5 ft 9 in) |
| Ragged Island | Mandy Quols | 24 | 1.73 m (5 ft 8 in) |
| Rum Cay | Shantera Brown | 26 | 1.70 m (5 ft 7 in) |
| San Salvador | Andrea Walker | 25 | 1.76 m (5 ft 9 1/2 in) |
| Spanish Wells | Raven Hepburn | 22 | 1.72 m (5 ft 7 1/2 in) |
