= Hope Town District Council =

- Council

Leadership
- Chief Councillor: Jeremy Sweeting
- Deputy-Chief Councillor: Harold Malone

Structure
- Seats: 5 Councillors
- Hope Town: 2 / 5
- Man-O-War Cay: 2 / 5
- Guana Cay: 1 / 5

Website
- http://www.hopetowncouncil.org/

The Hope Town District Council is a local government council in the Bahamas. It is a third schedule district council located within the Abaco Islands of the northwest Bahamas.

After the implementation of local government in the Bahamas in 1996, the Ministry of Local Government approved the creation of the Hope Town District in 1999. The initial council makeup included seven councillors, three from Hope Town, three from Man-O-War Cay, and one from Great Guana Cay. During the 2008 local government elections, the council makeup was downsized to five councillors, with two for Hope Town, two for Man-O-War Cay, and one for Great Guana Cay.

The Hope Town District Council is an amalgamation of thirteen islands: Great Guana Cay, Scotland Cay, Foot's Cay, Fowl Cay, Man-O-War Cay, Sandy Cay, Dickie's Cay, Garden Cay, Johnny's Cay, Elbow Cay (where the capital settlement Hope Town is located), Lubber's Quarters, Tilloo Cay, and the Pelican Cays.

== Pre-existence ==
When local government was introduced to the Bahamas in 1996, the Hope Town District Council did not exist. Hope Town had its own town committee and the neighboring communities of Man-O-War Cay and Great Guana Cay shared a town committee. The seat of Council was in Marsh Harbour that involved the Central Abaco area and the cays. The Town Committees of both Hope Town and Man-O-War Cay/Guana Cay each sent a Council member to sit on the Central Abaco Council.

== Creation of the council ==
Local government terms in the Bahamas are three years. After the first term of local government (1996–1999), the Minister of Local Government saw the need for the Cays to have its own council, and thus the Hope Town District Council was formed. The council consists of three settlements and surrounding cays, including the settlements of Great Guana Cay, Man-O-War Cay, and Elbow Cay. The other cays that are included are:

- Scotland Cay
- Canes Cay
- Sandy Cay
- Garden Cay
- Johnny's Cay
- Lubber's Quarters
- Parrot Cays
- Tilloo Cay
- Pelican Cays

== Council representation ==
The Hope Town District Council consists of seven members, all elected. Three members represent Elbow Cay, three members represent Man-O-War Cay, and one represents Great Guana Cay. These numbers are based on registered voter population, meaning that Elbow Cay and Man-O-War Cay have larger populations than Great Guana Cay.

The residents of Great Guana Cay have voiced concern over their representation feeling that they deserve equal representation with the other two towns. The Minister of Local Government was considering a change in the member structure for the 2008 local government elections.

== History ==
=== Hope Town Council 1999–2002 ===
This was the first council to serve on the actual Hope Town District Council. Elbow Cay (Hope Town) needed no elections as Suzanne Bethel, Scott Patterson, and Kevin Albury were elected unopposed. The same situation followed in Man-O-War; Roy Russell, Arthur Elden, and Richard Roberts were elected unopposed. In Great Guana Cay, Glenn Laing defeated Donna Sands in an election. The Chief Councillor and Deputy Chief Councillor are elected amongst the council, not directly by the people. After this group was elected, they choose Roy Russell as first Chief Councillor and Suzanne Bethel as Deputy Chief Councillor.

After three months into the term, Chief Councillor Russell insisted that the main office be in Man-O-War Cay, where he is resident. The Island Administrator disagreed and stated that Hope Town is the capital for the district and the office should always remain in Hope Town (Elbow Cay). As a result, the Man-O-War Council members resigned in protest. Man-O-War Cay went without representation for almost a year until Harcourt Thompson, Jimmy Albury, and Tony Albury were appointed to serve out the term.

The resignation of Chief Councillor Russell and the Man-O-War members left the Chief Councillor's position vacant and the council elected Suzanne Bethel as Chief Councillor and Kevin Albury as Deputy Chief Councillor. Into the term, Scott Patterson resigned, and Roscoe Thompson finished out his term.

No major dilemmas occurred during the term of this council, other than that being a new district, Chief Councillor Bethel and other councillors quickly discovered various challenges. The biggest is the diverseness of the different settlements even though they are within a tight-knit district. Under this term, Chief Councillor Bethel also undertook the establishment of the Pelican Cays' Land and Sea Park. As the term ended, Chief Councillor Bethel, after being active in local government and the Board of Works for almost forty years, retired from local government. Local residents still recognize her as their "Iron Lady" or "Margaret Thatcher"..

=== Hope Town Council 2002–2005 ===
The dust from the general election showdown in the Bahamas had not quite settled, and local government elections were set a month later. Elections in Hope Town had Jeff Key, Roscoe Thompson, and Diane Bethel, the victors, getting more votes to secure the three spots than Junior Meynard. In Man-O-War Cay, Walter Sweeting, Tony Albury, and Roy Russell won the election defeating George Phillpot, Jeremy Sweeting, Gary Sawyer, and Bill Albury. Glenn Laing went in for Great Guana Cay unopposed.

The council members elected Walter Sweeting as Chief Councillor and Jeff Key as Deputy Chief Councillor.

From the beginning, this council dealt with a controversial matter. They attempted to award a council member, Tony Albury, a government contract. Along with the fact that he was the highest bidder, much controversy ensued. After awarding the contract, Tony Albury resigned his post, and Haziel McDonald served his spot the remainder of the term. Much criticism arose from surrounding councils in Abaco, including from Yvonne Key of the Central Abaco Council, who publicly denounced the way the matter was handled.

Other than that, the life of this council went relatively smoothly without much other controversy. The road contract for Hope Town was signed while in office, and this road stretched from the post office to Dorris Cove. As the term ended, they did petition that the Minister of Local Government realign the Hope Town District Council so that each town could have their own council. The decision was deferred by the Minister.

=== Hope Town Council 2005–2008 ===
Elections in Hope Town had only one person nominated, Roy Cash. Appointed to the vacancies were Wayne Hall and Robert Malone. In Man-O-War Cay, Jeremy Sweeting was nominated, and Joe Albury and Chris Albury were appointed. Glenn Laing was re-elected to serve a third term in Great Guana Cay, defeating Anthony Roberts and Troy Albury.

Wayne Hall was elected the council's fourth Chief Councillor and Jeremy Sweeting elected as Deputy Chief Councillor.

This council has been viewed to be one of the most pro-active councils. Shortly after taking office, they went on a campaign with a white paper document that would implement zoning and building code laws for the district. After a four-month campaign, the white paper was defeated in a referendum. Although the council's idea was rejected by the district, Hope Town voters favoured the idea.

In May 2006, Chief Councillor Hall relocated to Nassau. The council then elected Jeremy Sweeting as Chief Councillor and Roy Cash as Deputy Chief Councillor. Jeremy Sweeting became the youngest Chief Councillor in the country's history. Harold Malone was elected by default to take Wayne Hall's seat as a council member.

Upon assuming the position of Chief Councillor, Jeremy Sweeting led the communities of the district, particularly Man-O-War Cay, through major reforms. He oversaw the introduction of the No Burning policy, which prohibited the burning of anything at the town's dumpsite. Additionally, the site overwent a major overhaul and received a facelift, improving the area. He led the communities in a Wall of Heroes programme, recognizing community builders in each community of the district. Chief Councillor Jeremy Sweeting unveiled a monument at the Old Cemetery in Man-O-War, recognizing the deceased residents buried in a cemetery that was damaged and seemed somewhat forgotten. The Chief Councillor then saw to the construction of a picnic area at the Low Place area in Man-O-War.

In May 2007, the national government changed hands, and thus in August of that year, the government called for elections for all appointed councillors.

In Hope Town, Councillor Robert Malone opted not to run, and Lana Russell ran and was unopposed. In Man-O-War Cay, Councillor Joe Albury opted not to run, but Councillor Christopher Albury ran, and was challenged by Roy Russell and Fred Sweeting. The latter two won election.

The remaining ten months of the term went relatively smoothly.
