= Man Island (Bahamas) =

Island in the Bahamas

Man Island Lighthouse
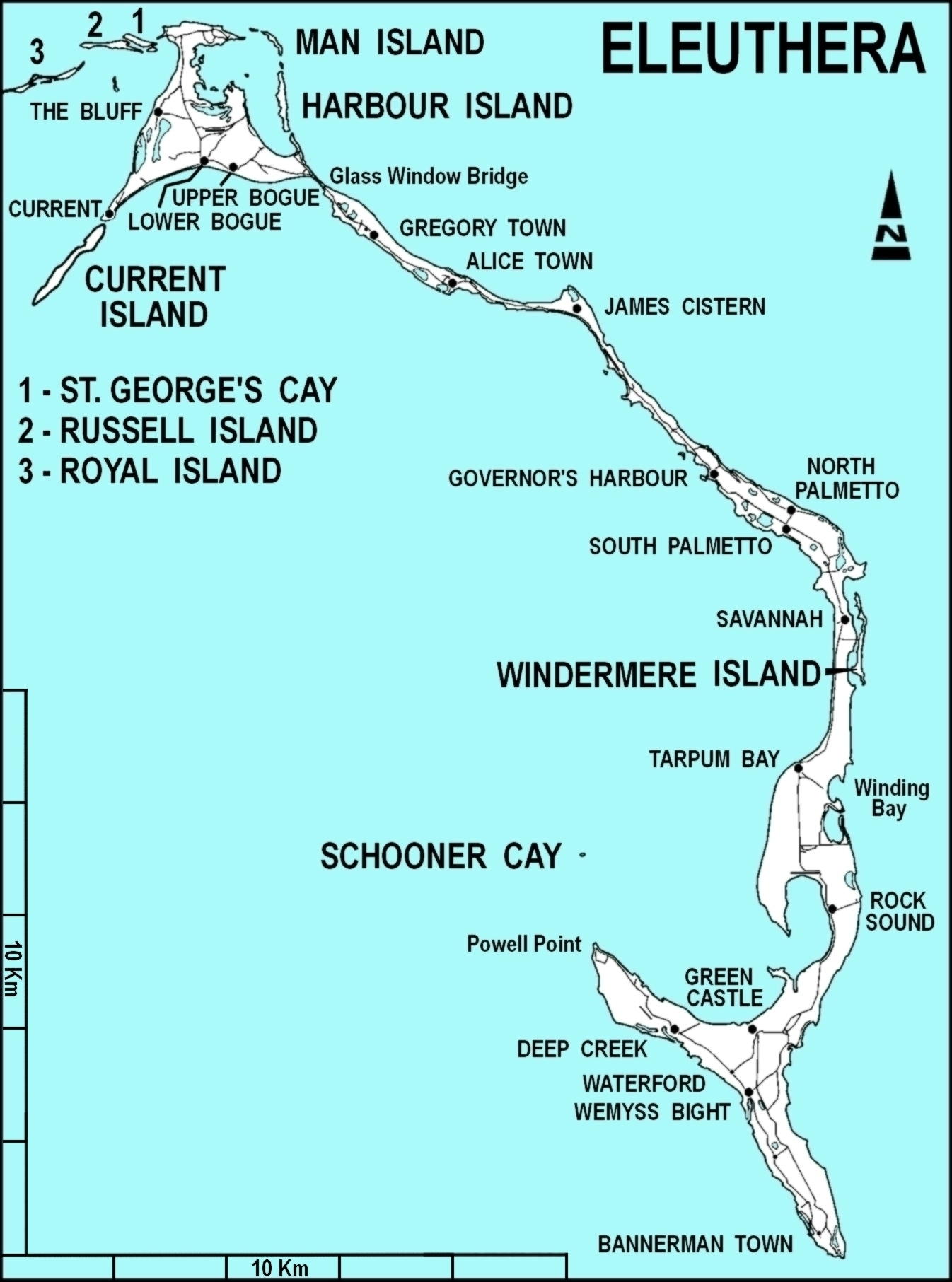
- Location: Man Island, North Eleuthera, The Bahamas
- Coordinates: 25°32′52″N 76°38′28″W

Tower
- Foundation: concrete base
- Construction: metal skeletal tower
- Height: 18 m (59 ft)
- Shape: square pyramidal skeletal tower
- Markings: White
- Power source: solar power

Light
- Focal height: 28 m (92 ft)
- Range: 12 nmi (22 km; 14 mi)
- Characteristic: Fl(3) W 15s

Man Island is a small, undeveloped island located near Eleuthera in the Bahamas Islands. Man Island is located in a group of islands that form a natural harbor and the largest island in this chain is Harbour Island. Man Island is situated between Harbour Island and the island of Spanish Wells.

Man Island's area is approximately 35 acres (140,000 m^{2}) owned by a number of individuals residing in the Bahamas, The United States and Europe. The island's proximity to Harbour Island (capital Dunmore Town) has aroused investor interest because of Harbour Island's increased tourist popularity.

Man Island runs north and south with the east side having beaches on the Atlantic Ocean and the west side facing a natural harbor.

== See also ==
- List of lighthouses in the Bahamas
