= Hope Town =

District of Hope Town
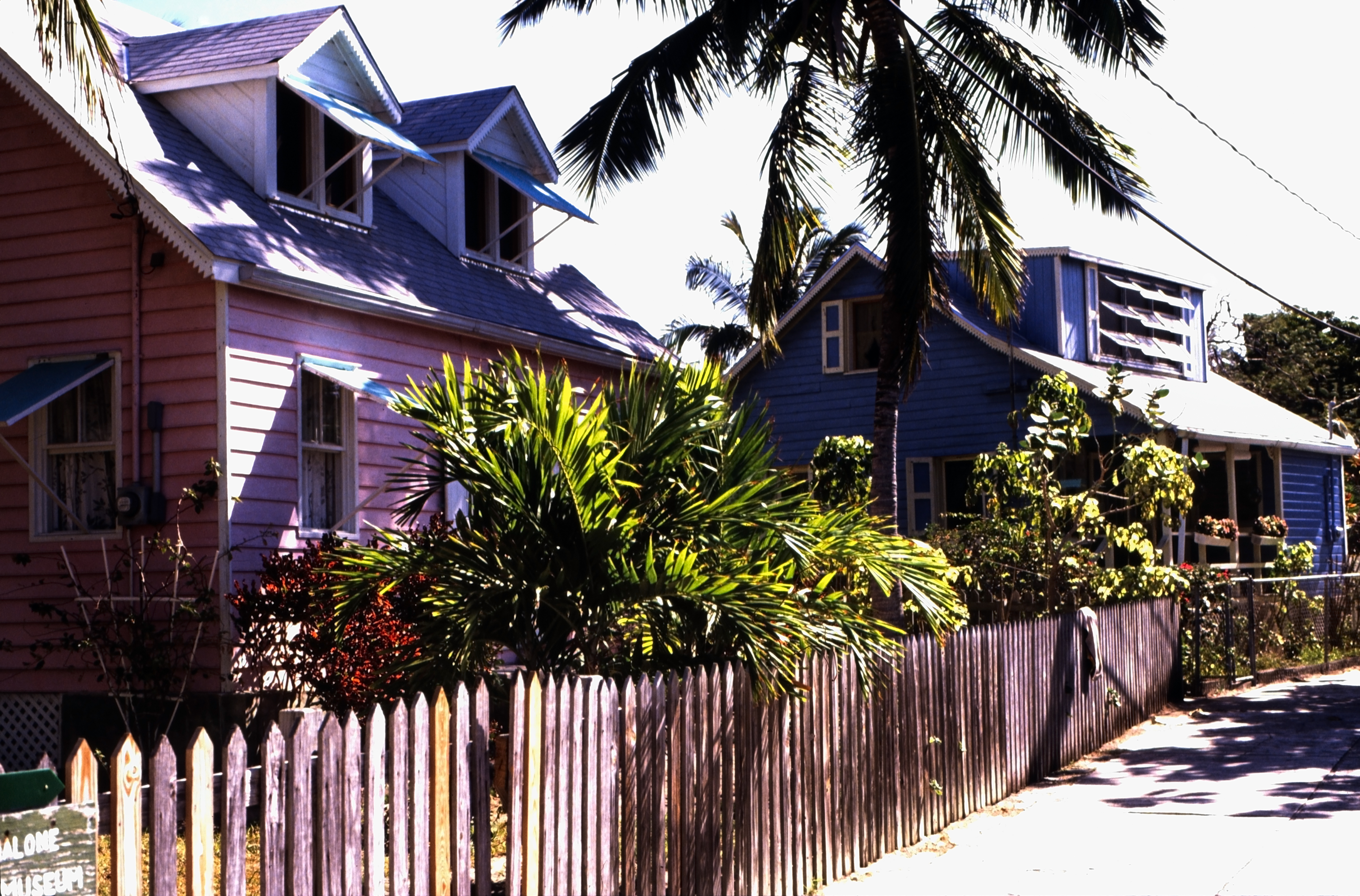

- Coordinates: 26°32′25″N 76°57′37″W
- Country: The Bahamas
- Island: Abaco
- Established: 1996

Government
  - Type: District Council
  - Chief Councillor: Jeremy Sweeting
  - Deputy Chief Councillor: John H W Pinder II

Population (2010)
  - Total: 458
- Time zone: UTC−5 (EST)
  - Summer (DST): UTC−4 (EDT)
- Area code: 242

Hope Town is one of the districts of the Bahamas, on the Abaco islands as well as a small village on Elbow Cay, located in Abaco. The area had a population of 458 in 2010.

Golf carts are the district's main mode of transportation, while most of the supplies for the area are brought in by barge each week. In Hope Town, neither cars nor golf carts are permitted in the main part of town. Only bicycles and walking are permitted. Though these laws are not strictly enforced, many of the streets in Hope Town are not wide enough to allow for golf cart traffic, or they are blocked off to the general public. Cars and golf carts are permitted on the outskirts of town. All the buildings that are built must adhere to Bahamian Architecture at the discretion of Town Planning. The seat of the Hope Town District Council is in Hope Town, and most of the meetings are held there.

== Elbow Reef Lighthouse ==
Elbow Cay lighthouse
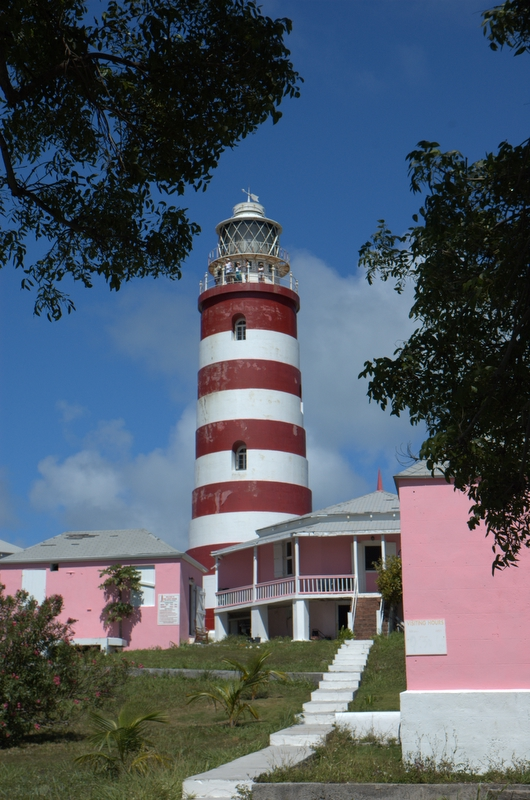
- The red and white striped lighthouse in Hope Town is a noted local landmark
- Location: Elbow Cay, Hope Town, The Bahamas
- Coordinates: 26°32′23″N 76°57′44″W

Tower
- Constructed: 1863
- Construction: masonry tower
- Height: 27 m (89 ft)
- Shape: conical tower with balcony and lantern
- Markings: tower painted in red and white bands, white lantern and grey dome
- Power source: kerosene
- Operator: Elbow Reef Lighthouse Society

Light
- First lit: 1863
- Focal height: 37 m (121 ft)
- Lens: First order Fresnel (transferred from Gun Cay in 1936)
- Intensity: 325,000 candela
- Range: 23 nmi (43 km; 26 mi)
- Characteristic: Fl(5) W 15s

Hope Town features one of the last operational kerosene-fueled lighthouses in the world. This lighthouse was built in 1862 and became operational two years later, it is striped horizontally red and white. Its light can be seen from 23 nmi (43 km) away.

The Elbow Reef Lighthouse is one of only three manual lighthouses left in the world. It has a weight mechanism that has to be hand cranked every several hours to maintain the sequence of five white flashes every 15 seconds. The lamp burns kerosene oil with a wick and mantle, at the rate of 1 gallon per night. The light is then focused as it passes through the optics of a first order Fresnel lens which floats on a bed of mercury.

The Elbow Reef Lighthouse Society, (a Bahamian Non-Profit) is responsible for keeping the site true to its historical past as a fully-working, non-automated, aid to navigation. Entrusted by the Ministry of Transportation and Local Government, (responsible for the Port Department and Maritime Affairs), The ERLS is the Elbow Reef Lightstation's infrastructural custodian, tasked with the oversight and ongoing preservation and restoration of the Lighthouse and Lightstation itself which comprises the lighthouse tower, two lighthouse keeper's quarters, six outbuildings, one gift shoppe and the wharf/dock. Websites: elbowreeflighthousesociety.com and elbowreef.org

== Tourism ==
The Hopetown downtown area is home to the colonial "Cholera Cemetery". Cholera swept through the island in the 1850s, killing over one hundred English colonists that had settled the island.

Tahiti Beach is located on the southernmost portion of the island. During low tide, a sand pathway stretches far into the ocean from the beach. It is a popular spot for boat-docking and shark-spotting.

One of the only safe breaks to surf in the Elbow Keys is found in the center of the island, outside of the Abaco Inn. Surfers and spectators alike gather there for swells off the east coast of the island.

== Weather and climate ==
The weather in Hope Town is very similar to that of South Florida. Hope Town and the surrounding islands of Abaco generally follow five weather patterns throughout the year. The winter cold fronts (or Canada Clippers) that pass down to south Florida also affect the Abacos, although occasionally some stall before getting to the northern Bahamas. They are often over by the end of April, and from that point, Hope Town's temperature increases, staying warm until September. During September and October showers recommence and Hope Town often experiences rain. In November and December the cold fronts hit Abaco again.

A table showing temperatures for Hope Town

=== Hurricanes ===
Hope Town experiences hurricanes as often as Florida, and over the last decade the number has stayed high. Hope Town's most notable hurricane is considered to be Hurricane Dorian, that hit on September 1, 2019, as a Category 5 hurricane on the Saffir–Simpson scale.

== In popular culture ==
In 2009, TV comedy Scrubs filmed a two-part special on location in Hope Town. The episodes featured Hope Town landmarks and points of interest such as the Elbow Cay lighthouse. Eighty-four cast and crew members turned up in Hope Town, temporarily increasing its population of 300 by over a quarter.

Season 3 of TLC's Little People, Big World also features the Roloff family visiting The Bahamas, where they make two stops in Hope Town. A visit to the lighthouse is featured, as well as a scene with the local Methodist church.

Red Hot Chili Peppers drummer, Chad Smith, was married by the lighthouse in Hope Town.

Season 3 of HGTV's Bahamas Life follows Florida couple Brian and Rana through the process of searching for a house in Hopetown for their family. Several of the homes on the island as well as scenic shots from around the island are featured in the episode.

== See also ==
- List of lighthouses in The Bahamas
