= The Bluff, Bahamas =

The Bluff
- Location within Bahamas
- Coordinates: 25°28′N 76°46′W
- Country: Bahamas
- Island: North Eleuthera
- Time zone: UTC-5 (Eastern Time Zone)

The Bluff very often refers to a settlement on North Eleuthera, Bahamas. But there are three Bahamian communities having 'Bluff' in their name.

== South Andros ==
There are three settlements in the Bahamas called "The Bluff". The first is on South Andros Island. It is the most densely populated settlement on the island. It hosts a Homecoming every year, the first weekend in June on its Regatta site. Also, the Bluff is home to the 'Government' buildings like the police station, the Post Office and BaTelCo.

== North Eleuthera ==
Another settlement called "The Bluff" (or simply "Bluff") is on the west coast of North Eleuthera Island.

In 1783, after he had served with the Pennsylvania Loyalists and the Carolina Rangers, James Kelly (1754-1808), cited as entering the Bahamas via East Florida and accompanied by Hugh Kelly, was awarded 500 acres in the vicinity of Bluff, Eleuthera. James Kelly first married Susan Turner and then Elizabeth Kemp and had a plantation at Bluff. A plantation house may have been built but the location of its remains is unknown.

It seems likely that the Kellys left Bluff. Indeed historic records of Kelly descendants are found at Current, Harbour Island, Nassau, all in the Bahamas, and Key West, Florida. Records for Kellys of African ancestry, presumably former slaves, are also found in the vicinity.

At the National Archives in Nassau, Bahamas, there exists a will from one Christopher Neely, a white slaveholder (a British loyalist originally from South Carolina in the colonies). In his 1807 will he makes specific references to his slaves on Abaco and New Providence Islands. In this will he states that it is his desire that his 24 slaves on Abaco Island be freed upon his death, which came within several months of his will. Oral history states that this settlement, inhabited by people with the Neely surname was established by these freed slaves from Abaco Island.

By 1849, it exported pineapples and citrus fruit. Louis Diston Powles visited Eleuthera, and in his book The Land of the Pearl (1888) referred to the Bluff settlement and its black residents, most notably John Neely, the tacitly accepted leader of the settlement.

The (Eleuthera) Bluff settlement sponsors an annual homecoming event the second weekend of July which generally coincides with the Independence Day celebrations taking place throughout the entire Bahamas.

== Cat Island ==
The third settlement called Bluff is on Cat Island.
