= Chief Councillor =

A Chief Councilor is the highest position within a District Council of the Bahamas. As provided within the Bahamas Local Government Act of 1996, the Chief Councillor is the representative of the council for all purposes. The councillor's tenure in office begins from the very day of election until the expiration of the term as prescribed by their respective District Council or if they so wish to resign (whichever may come sooner).

== List of Chief Councillors ==
Pinder’s Point Township

Jacquline Russell - Chairman

Adrian Simmons -Deputy Chairperson

Lowell Pinder - Councillor

Simon Lewis

Quincy Bevans

Alexio Forbes

Devon Russell

Jason Smith

Lenise williams

EGHT MILE ROCK EAST

Kevin Wildgoose- Chairman

Willis Baldwin Rolle

Yannick Rodger - Councillor

Marvette Russell - Councillor

Rosney Cooper

Malisa Dean-Strachan

Felix Delancy

Larry Wildgoose

Newann Rolle

EIGHT MILE ROCK WEST

Cristian Palacious Administrator IV West Grand Bahama Grand Bahama

Kevin Morris - Chairperson

Karen Leadon – Deputy Chairperson

Jaron Harvey - Councillor

George Smith

Denise Russell

Alexander D. Rolle

Chouen Stuart

Tyrone D. Kemp

Tadd S. Martin

West Grand Bahama District Local Government Practitioners

Ken Barr-Smith - Chairperson

Morton Wilchcombe – Deputy Chairperson

Keithora Munroe - Councillor

Patara Cooper

Warren Saunders

Constance Hanna

Mauva Hanna

Carolyn Ferguson

Marvin McQueen

CITY OF FREEPORT

Brenda Colebrooke Acting Director/Administrator City of Freeport Council

KENDAL CULMER – CHIEF COUNCILLOR

ERNIE BARR – DEPUTY COUNCILLOR

MARCO CAREY

RAVANNO FERGUSON

EARL NEELY

ERRIS HUTCHESON

DR. CHARLENE REID-MORRIS

FRAZETTE GIBSON

BERNARD GRANT

MAYAGUANA DISTRICT COUNCIL 2022

Huel Williamson - Chief Councillor

Lutherio Brooks - Deputy Chief

Ayesha Charlton

Marissa Burrows

Vincent Murphy
