= San Salvador and Rum Cay =

Former Bahamas district

Coordinates: 23°51′N 74°40′W

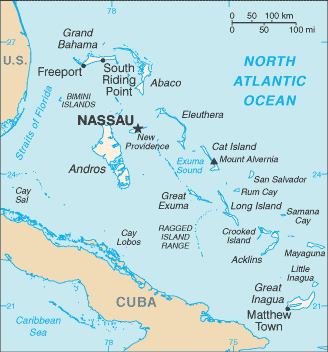

San Salvador and Rum Cay is a former district of the Bahamas. The Main settlement in Rum Cay is Port Nelson. In 1977, the district was estimated to be home to 860 people. In 1996 it was divided into separate districts of San Salvador and Rum Cay.
