= Nichollstown and Berry Islands =

Nichollstown and Berry Islands was a district of the Bahamas. It included the northern portion of the island of Andros, with a population of 3,444 in the year 2000, as well as the nearby Berry Islands, which had a population of 809 at that time.

In 1996, the Berry Islands were established as a separate district, while the Nichollstown area was redefined as part of the administrative district of North Andros.
