= Pirates Well =

Pirate's Well
- Location within Bahamas
- Coordinates: 22°25′58″N 73°06′03″W
- Country: Bahamas
- Island: Mayaguana
- District: Mayaguana

Population (2012)
  - Total: 235
- Time zone: UTC-5 (Eastern Time Zone)
- Area code: 242

Pirate's Well is a settlement on the northern side of Mayaguana (the easternmost island of The Bahamas). It has a population of approximately 235 (2012 estimates). Pirate's Well is home to a well, clearly marked by a sign and circled by stones and mortar, that was dug by buccaneers in the 16th century, hence the name. The Baycaner Beach Resort is located in Pirate's Well.

It is 500 km southeast of the capital Nassau. Pirate's Well is 5 meters above sea level. Average annual temperature in the village is 25 °C . The warmest month is August, when the average temperature is 28 °C, and the coldest is January, with 23 °C. The average annual rainfall is 1,026 millimeters. The rainiest month is October, with an average of 244 mm rainfall, and the driest is March, with 9 mm rainfall.

During Hurricane Irma the sea wall was damaged and several power lines were down in Pirate's Well but there was no serious damage to houses.
