= High Rock, Bahamas =

Coordinates: 27°00′N 78°12′W

High Rock is a former district of the Bahamas. It corresponds roughly to the current district of East Grand Bahama. The Bahamian Brewery makes a High Rock beer.
