= South Abaco =

District of The Bahamas

Coordinates: 26°03′N 77°15′W

The Location of the District of South Abaco

South Abaco is one of the districts of the Bahamas, on the Abaco Islands.

The district had a population of 7,646 in 2010. Sandy Point is one of the largest settlements.
