= Abraham's Bay =

Town in Mayaguana, Bahamas

- Town
- Location within Bahamas
- Coordinates: 22°22′30″N 72°57′44″W
- Country: Bahamas
- Island: Mayaguana

Government
  - Mayor: Thomas Dawson

Population (2010)
  - Total: 143
- Time zone: UTC-5 (Eastern Time Zone)
- Area code: 242

Abraham's Bay (named after Abraham Charlton) is a town in the Bahamas. It is located on the south side of Mayaguana Island. According to the 2010 Census, it had a population of 143.

== Notable places ==
Notable places include:

- Charlton House(former homestead of one of the prominent local families, including the Charlton family)
- Zion Baptist Church and Church of God of Prophecy.
