= Black Point, Bahamas =

District in The Bahamas

Coordinates: 24°05′30″N 76°23′40″W

Black Point is one of the districts of the Bahamas. As of 2010, it has a population of 414 and an area of 12.1 km^{2}.
