= Dunmore Town =

Town on Harbour Island, the Bahamas

- Location within Bahamas
- Coordinates: 25°30′07″N 76°38′09″W
- Country: Bahamas
- Island: Harbour Island
- District: Harbour Island

Population (2010)
  - Total: 1,762
- Time zone: UTC-5 (Eastern Time Zone)
- Area code: 242
- Website: Official website

Dunmore Town is a town in the Bahamas. It has a population of 1,762 (2010 census).

It is the only town at Harbour Island, which is located just east from North Eleuthera.

Dunmore Town is one of the few settlements in the Bahamas with a predominantly White population, of European ancestry.
