= Colonel Hill =

Town on Crooked Island, Bahamas

- Location of Colonel Hill in the Bahamas
- Coordinates: 22°46′N 74°13′W
- Country: Bahamas
- Island: Crooked Island
- District: Crooked Island

Population (2010)
  - Total: 51
- Time zone: UTC-5 (Eastern Time Zone)
- Area code: 242

Colonel Hill is a town in the Bahamas, located on Crooked Island. As of 2010 it has a population of 51.

The area is served by Colonel Hill Airport.
