= Elbow Cay =

Five-mile-long cay in the Abaco Islands of the Bahamas

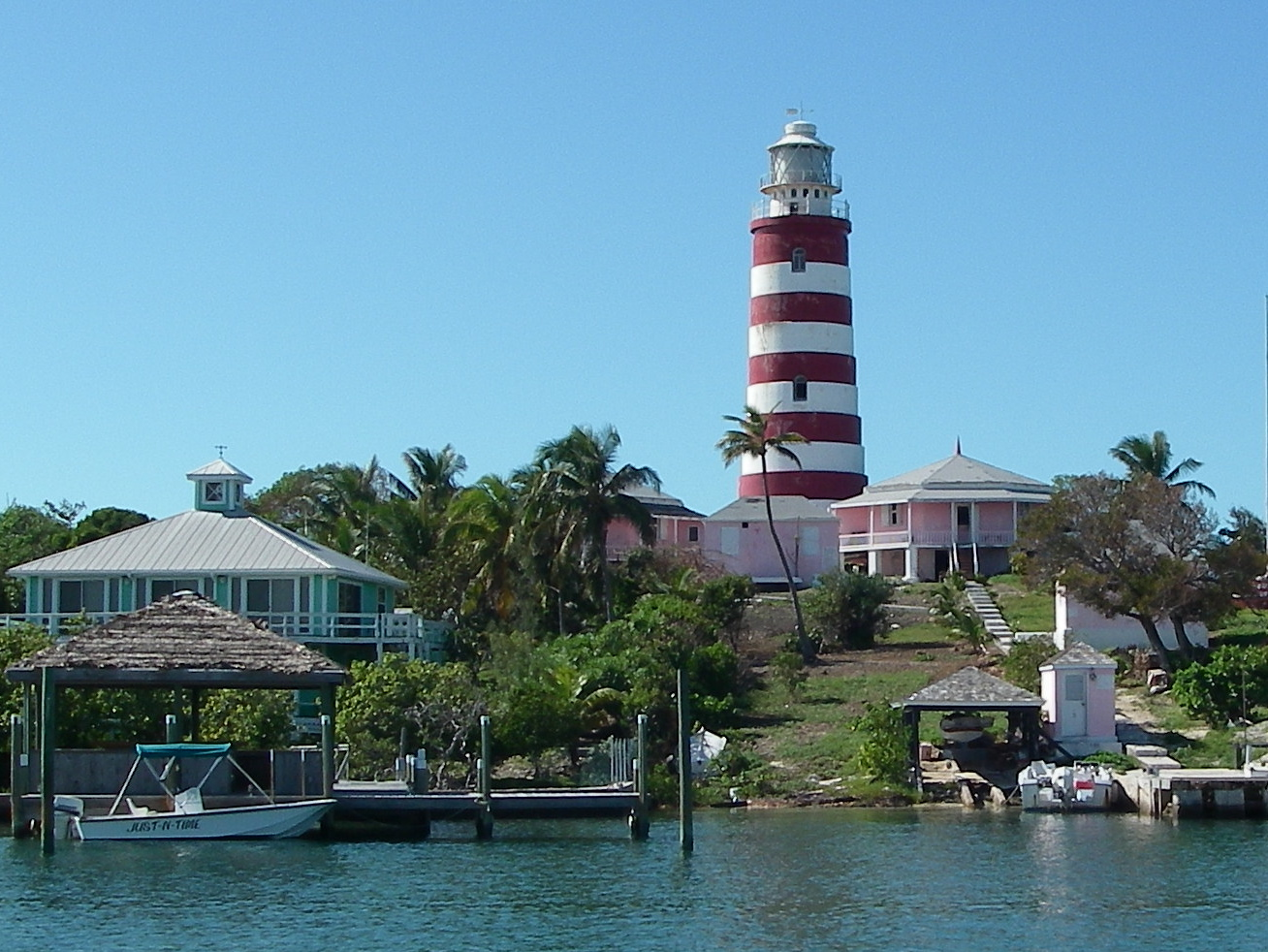
- Elbow Reef Lighthouse

- Location within Bahamas

Geography
- Location: Atlantic Ocean
- Coordinates: 26°31′37″N 76°58′05″W
- Type: Cay
- Archipelago: Lucayan Archipelago

Administration
- The Bahamas

Demographics
- Population: 400

Elbow Cay is a five-mile-long (8.0-kilometre) cay in the Abaco Islands of The Bahamas. Originally populated by British loyalists fleeing the newly independent United States of America in 1785, it has survived on fishing, boat building, and salvage. Its main village of Hope Town surrounds a protected harbor with a noted red-and-white-striped one-hundred-and-twenty-foot-tall (37-metre) lighthouse built in 1863. On September 1, 2019, Elbow Cay took a direct hit from Category 5 Hurricane Dorian, with sustained winds of 185 mph (295 km/h). The lighthouse survived.

== Geography ==
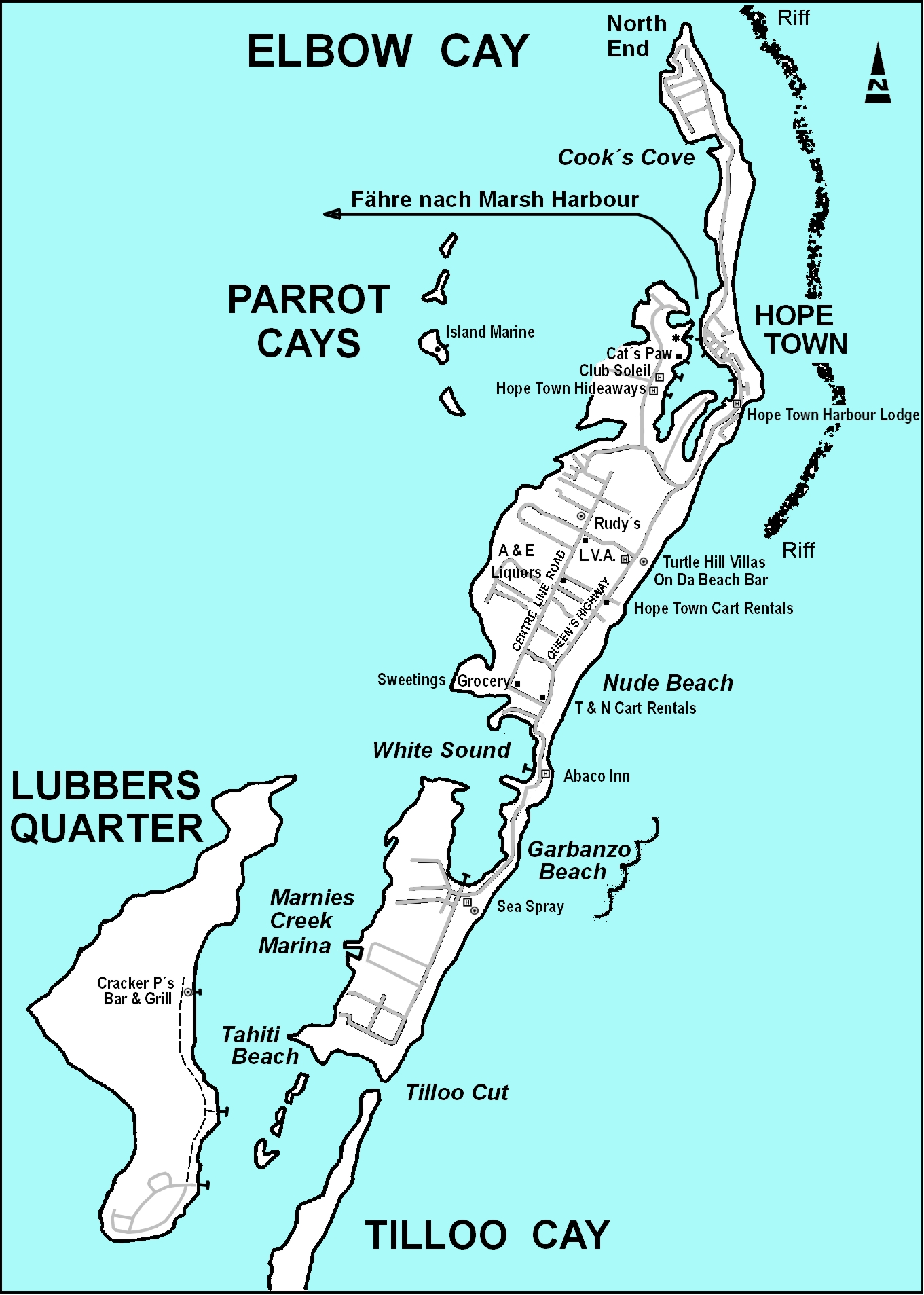
Map of Elbow Cay Panorama from the Elbow Cay lighthouse in Abaco, Bahamas

Elbow Cay is located about 4 miles (6.4 kilometres) east of Marsh Harbour on Great Abaco Island. Most visitors fly into Marsh Harbour and take the ferry to either Hope Town at the Northern end of Elbow Cay or White Sound, a mid-island harbour and settlement developed in 1960. At the Southern end of the island is Tahiti Beach near Doros Cove. The Atlantic Ocean runs along the entire Eastern coast of Elbow Cay, while the South Abaco Sound is on the western coast.

Elbow Cay is between Man-O-War Cay to the north and Tiloo Cay to the south. Lubbers Quarters Cay is west of the southern End of Elbow Cay.

== History ==
Although visited by Lucayan Indians earlier, the first known permanent residents arrived in 1785 in what was known as Great Harbour. Wyannie Malone, originally from Charleston, South Carolina and other British Loyalists left the United States for the nearest British territory in The Bahamas.

Elbow Cay and the Abacos were very isolated until the Marsh Harbour Airport was built in 1959. Before that, the residents survived by fishing, limited trading, and salvage of ships wrecked on Elbow Reef. Since then, contact with the outside world has brought in additional residents and tourism.

Hope Town originally served as the administrative centre of the Abacos, until it switched over to Marsh Harbour in the 1960s.

In 2015, a faring from a SpaceX rocket drifted ashore on Elbow Cay.

== Today ==
Hope Town is the largest settlement which contains several grocery stores including Vernons Grocery run by a descendant of Wyannie Malone, rental properties and restaurants. Cars and golf carts can drive up to, but not through Hopetown. Further south, there are more residences and rental properties spread out along the roads to the narrow part of the island near White Sound. The Abaco Inn and Seaspray properties offer rooms and restaurants. At the Southern end of the island is Tahiti Beach with a beautiful sand beach and nearby snorkelling in Tiloo Cut, the inlet separating Elbow Cay from Tiloo Cay.

There is telephone service, but most residents depend on the VHF radios to communicate.

== Hurricanes ==
Elbow Cay suffered significant damage in 1999 from Hurricane Floyd. It nearly cut a new inlet near White Sound. The road remains damaged to this day.

On September 1, 2019, Hurricane Dorian made landfall on Elbow Cay at 16:40 UTC with winds of 185 mph (295 km/h) and wind gusts up to 225 mph (360 km/h), tying Dorian with the 1935 Labor Day hurricane as the strongest landfalling Atlantic hurricane of all time in terms of sustained winds. ABC News reported damage as "catastrophic" and "pure hell", throughout the island.

== In popular culture ==
The episodes "My Soul on Fire" (Part 1 and 2) of the TV series Scrubs were filmed on the island for the Janitor and Lady's wedding. The lighthouse and other businesses were shown in the episode.
