= Cockburn Town, Bahamas =

Town on San Salvador Island, Bahamas

Cockburn Town
- Town
- Location within Bahamas
- Coordinates: 24°03′05″N 74°31′47″W
- Country: Bahamas
- Island: San Salvador Island
- District: San Salvador Island

Population (2010)
  - Total: 271
- Time zone: UTC-5 (Eastern Time Zone)
- Area code: 242

Cockburn Town is a town in the Bahamas, located on San Salvador Island. It has a population of 271 as of 2010. In the town there is an airport, museum, administrator's office, post office, clinic, telecommunication station, and electricity generators. A favourite gathering place for locals is the huge almond tree at the entrance of the town.

== History ==
Cockburn Town is named after Francis Cockburn, Royal Governor and Commander-in-Chief of the Bahamas from 1837 to 1844. Several buildings in Cockburn Town date from the 1800s, including the old jail.
