= Grand Cay =

Coordinates: 27.2239°N 78.3239°W

District of Grand Cay Grand Cay
- Location of the District of Grand Cay
- Country: Bahamas
- Island: Grand Cay

Government
  - Type: District Council

Population (2010)
  - Total: 383
- Time zone: UTC−5 (EST)
  - Summer (DST): UTC−4 (EDT)
- Area code: 242

Grand Cay is one of the districts of the Bahamas. It is geographically located in the Abaco Islands.

Grand Cay is a small island or cay situated south of Walker's Cay in the Bahamas Islands. It is a settlement of Abaco, a major island of the Bahamas. After a hurricane's devastation of Walker's Cay, and other matters, Walker's Cay's workers were forced to go back to Grand Cay to seek employment. Previously, Grand Cay was seen as a base or home; but presently it is an island containing the main occupations and housing. It has a population of 383.(2010 census) Grand Cay is notable for being a tourists' haven, and a peaceful, fishing community.

Today on many of the cays people make a living fishing and lobstering.

In terms of education, Grand Cay hosts the Grand Cay All Age School, which is located under the Grand Bahama District. The school population varies from 100–115.

This was the island of choice of U.S. President Richard Nixon, a friend of Robert Abplanalp, an island resident.

Few gas docks, restaurants and other places to suit the tourist industry are found on the island.

It's about a mile in length.
