= Local government in the Bahamas =

Local government in the Bahamas exists at two levels: 32 districts and 41 towns. The boundaries of districts are defined by the First Schedule of The Bahamas Local Government Act 1996 (as amended by law and declarations of the Minister responsible for Family Island Affairs), defined with reference to parliamentary constituency boundaries. The Second Schedule lists 13 districts which are divided into town areas. Towns are governed by directly elected town committees. Second Schedule districts are governed by nine-person district councils composed of the chairs of the town committees, and if numerically required, additional people elected by the town committees. The 19 Third Schedule districts are unitary authorities which cannot be divided into towns. They are governed by nine-person district councils which are directly elected by voters. The powers of Second Schedule and Third Schedule councils are slightly different, and the Third Schedule district known as the City of Freeport has a slightly different list of enumerated powers.

At the national level, local government policy is formulated and administered by the Department of Lands and Local Government through the Office of the Prime Minister. The day-to-day policy handling of the portfolio falls to the Minister of Local Government who also is empowered to modify the list and boundaries of districts. Administrative and financial management of local government is overseen by the ministry's permanent secretary.

== History ==
Local government previously existed in the Bahamas in the form of appointed "Board of Works". Here towns and villages held their influence over these Board of Works, but almost all final decisions were made by the central government through that islands' Commissioner. The modern system of local government that is in use today was created by The Bahamas Local Government Act 1996. The Out Islands of the country enjoy a somewhat greater degree of autonomy, but New Providence Island, hosting capital city Nassau, is directly governed by the central government. The Act defines the form of government in each district by listing it on either its Second Schedule or its Third Schedule.

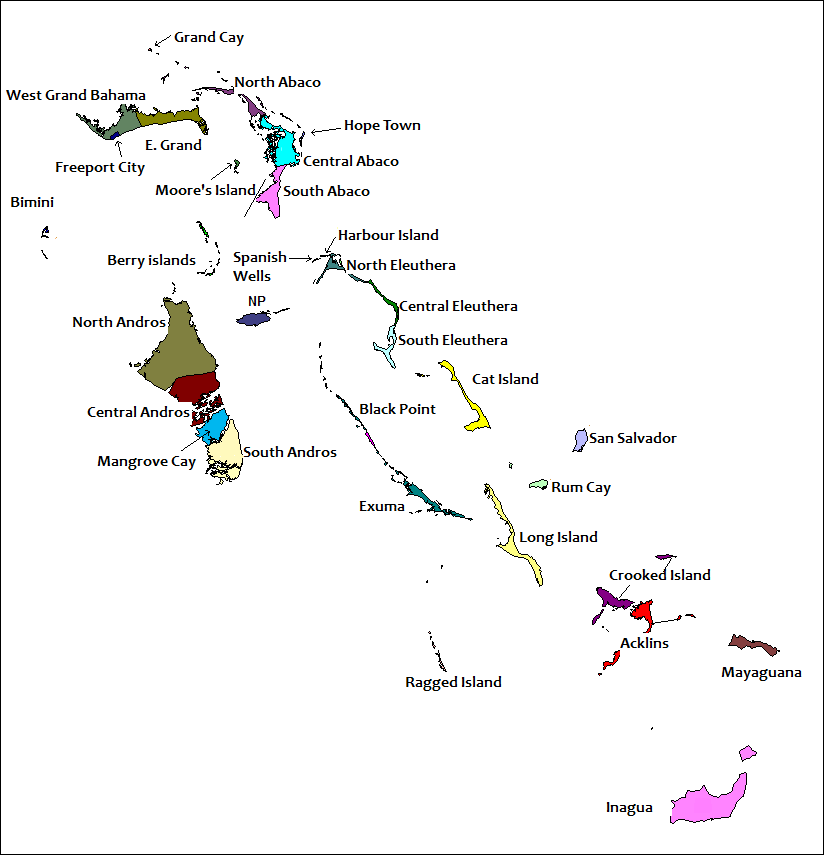
Map of the districts of the Bahamas

== Districts ==
The Districts of the Bahamas provide a system of local government everywhere in the Bahamas except New Providence (where Nassau the capital is located, whose affairs are handled directly by the central government). The current system dates from 1996 when 23 districts were created by The Bahamas Local Government Act of 1996. The districts were last defined according to the Local Government Act 2024, keeping in place the 33 districts existing at that time. This act also increased the financial autonomy of the districts by allowing them to raise their own revenue through taxes, fees and grants.

Since the creation of the system, the question of local government for New Providence has been debated. The Minister responsible for Family Island Affairs has the power to create one or more districts for all or part of New Providence by decree.

The Second Schedule districts are:

- North Abaco
- Central Abaco
- South Abaco
- North Andros
- Central Andros
- South Andros
- Cat Island
- Central Eleuthera
- South Eleuthera
- Exuma
- East Grand Bahama
- West Grand Bahama
- Long Island

The Third Schedule districts are:

- Acklins
- Berry Islands
- Bimini
- City of Freeport
- Crooked Island & Long Cay
- Exuma Cays (formerly Black Point)
- Grand Cay
- Great Abaco Cays (formerly Hope Town)
- Green Turtle Cay
- Harbour Island
- Inagua
- Mangrove Cay
- Mayaguana
- Moore's Island
- North Eleuthera
- Ragged Island
- Rum Cay
- San Salvador
- Spanish Wells

=== New Providence ===
There are 24 supervisory districts of New Providence island.

Supervisory districts
Name	Population (2022)	Male	Female
Bain and Grants Town	10,361	4,996	5,365
Bamboo Town	13,965	6,734	7,231
Carmichael	11,931	5,753	6,178
Centreville	12,817	6,180	6,637
Elizabeth	13,468	6,494	6,974
Englerston	12,082	5,826	6,256
Freetown	12,943	6,241	6,702
Fort Charlotte	10,809	5,212	5,597
Fox Hill	13,855	6,681	7,174
Garden Hills	10,423	5,026	5,397
Golden Gates	9,924	4,785	5,139
Golden Isles	16,220	7,821	8,399
Killarney	17,679	8,525	9,154
Marathon	11,788	5,684	6,104
Mount Moriah	10,338	4,985	5,353
Nassau Village	11,717	5,650	6,067
Pinewood	10,666	5,143	5,523
Sea Breeze	12,682	6,115	6,567
South Beach	12,292	5,927	6,365
Southern Shores	12,831	6,187	6,644
St Annes	13,037	6,286	6,751
St Barnabas	10,570	5,097	5,473
Tall Pines	15,135	7,298	7,837
Yamacraw	8,988	4,334	4,654
New Providence	296,521	142,980	153,541
The Bahamas	398,916	192,546	206,370

=== Demographics ===
District(s) or Other Area	Island Group	Population (2022)	Male	Female	Largest City
Acklins		692	334	358	Salina Point
Berry Islands		1,016	490	526	Great Harbour Cay
Bimini		2,418	1,166	1,252	Alice Town
Cat Island		1,601	772	829	New Bight
Central Grand Bahama (parliamentary constituency in Freeport)	Grand Bahama	11,496	5,543	5,953	Freeport
Crooked Island		305	147	158	Landrial Point
East Grand Bahama	Grand Bahama	11,011	5,502	5,509	Pelican Point
Exuma + Black Point		7,293	3,517	3,776	George Town
Harbour Island	Eleuthera	1,861	897	964	Dunmore Town
Inagua		856	413	443	Matthew Town
Long Island		2,887	1,392	1,495	Burnt Ground
Marco City (parliamentary constituency in Freeport)	Grand Bahama	10,527	5,076	5,451	Freeport
Mayaguana		208	100	108	Abraham's Bay
New Providence		296,521	142,980	153,541	Nassau
North Abaco + Grand Cay + Green Turtle Cay + Hope Town	Abaco	10,057	4,849	5,208	Treasure Cay
North Andros	Andros	4,069	1,962	2,107	Nicholls Town
North Eleuthera	Eleuthera	3,923	1,892	2,031	The Bluff
Pineridge (parliamentary constituency in Freeport)	Grand Bahama	8,082	3,897	4,185	Freeport
Ragged Island		44	21	23	Duncan Town
Rum Cay		90	43	47	Port Nelson
San Salvador		825	398	427	Cockburn Town
South Abaco + Central Abaco + Moore's Island	Abaco	6,530	3,149	3,381	Marsh Harbour
South Andros + Central Andros + Mangrove Cay	Andros	3,711	1,789	1,922	Moxey Town
South Eleuthera + Central Eleuthera	Eleuthera	5,324	2,567	2,757	Rock Sound
Spanish Wells	Eleuthera	1,609	776	833	Spanish Wells
West Grand Bahama	Grand Bahama	5,960	2,874	3,086	West End
The Bahamas		398,916	192,546	206,370	Nassau (Capital)

== Towns ==
As of the 2022 local elections, the town areas of the Bahamas include:

- Cat Island District
  - Arthur's Town
  - The Bight
- Central Abaco District
  - Marsh Harbour and Spring City
  - Murphy Town
  - Dundas Town
- Central Andros District
  - Behring Point and Cargill Creek
  - Fresh Creek
  - Staniard Creek
- Central Eleuthera District
  - Gregory Town
  - Savannah Sound
  - James Cistern Town
  - Hatchet Bay
- East Grand Bahama District
  - McCleans Town and Pelican Point
  - Freetown
- Exuma District
  - East Exuma
  - West Exuma
- Long Island District
  - North End
- North Abaco District
  - Little Abaco
  - Cooper's Town
  - Treasure Cay
- North Andros District
  - Lowe Sound
  - Nicholls Town
  - Mastic Point
- South Abaco District
  - Crossing Rock
  - Sandy Point
- South Andros District
  - Deep Creek
  - Kemp's Bay
  - The Bluff
  - Long Bay Cays
- South Eleuthera District
  - Wemyss Bight
- West Grand Bahama District
  - Eight Mile Rock West
  - Pinder's Point

== Types of councils ==
Every district in the Bahamas, with the exception of New Providence, has a district council. A district council is a corporate body with perpetual succession; capable of entering into contracts, of suing and being sued, of acquiring, holding, leasing and disposing of property of any description, and of doing all such things and entering into such transactions that are within the scope of the Local Government Act. District Councillors are elected by the population of that district in accordance with Local Government Act. As stated in The Bahamas Local Government Act 1996, Districts councillors shall within two weeks of their election, elect from among themselves a Chief Councillor. The Chief Councillor is the representative of a Districts Council for all affairs and presides over all meetings and also themselves co-ordinate these meetings.

All districts councils are classed as first-schedule councils. The first-schedule is further sub-divided into two types of councils: two tier second-schedule district councils that have town committees within their jurisdiction, and unitary third-tier district councils. Second-schedule districts have the following statutory boards and committees:

- Road Traffic Licensing Authority
- Port and Harbour Authority
- Hotel Licensing Board
- Liquor and Shop Licensing
- Town Planning Committee

Town committees are sub-structures of the second-schedule district councils, but are also corporate bodies themselves. They share responsibility with second-schedule district councils for a number of the schedule local government functions. They also have statutory responsibility for local regulation and licensing within their jurisdiction. Third-schedule districts councils are unique within the Bahamas because they combine the responsibilities of the second-schedule districts and of the town committees. Both second- and third-schedule district councils carry out a building control function.

Distribution of councils and population (2022 Census)
Island Group	2nd tier	3rd tier	Town (+1,000)	Population
New Providence	0	0	1	296,521
Abaco islands	2	0	4	16,587
Acklins	0	1	0	692
Andros Island	2	0	0	7,780
Berry Islands	0	1	0	1,016
Bimini	0	1	1	2,418
Cat Island	1	0	0	1,601
Crooked Island	0	1	0	305
Grand Bahama	2	3	2	47,076
Eleuthera	2	2	2	12,717
Exuma and Cays	1	0	1	7,293
Inagua	0	1	0	856
Long Island	1	0	0	2,887
Mayaguana	0	1	0	208
Ragged Island	0	1	0	44
Rum Cay	0	1	0	90
San Salvador	0	1	0	825
TOTAL	13	19		351,461

== Elections ==
Local government elections take place once every three years in the Bahamas with the most recent elections taking place on 27 January 2022. The 2020 elections were postponed due to COVID-19 until Emergency Power Orders were lifted. The voting system used in local government elections is the first-past-the-post system. Both councillors of third-schedule district councils and members of town committees are directly elected, while members of second-schedule councils are indirectly elected from town committees. Third schedule district councils have between five and nine members, whereas the size of councils in both second-schedule councils and town committees varies according to population size. By elections are held whenever the need arises. A councillor is deemed to have resigned if they are absent for three consecutive meetings.

For both types of district councils the Chief Councillors and their deputies are indirectly elected from amongst the elected officials. They serve for the lifetime of the council and the Minister of Local Government determines their stipend. Second-schedule district councils' statutory boards also elect chairpersons and their deputies from amongst their members.

== Major islands ==
Reference map for the Islands of the Bahamas
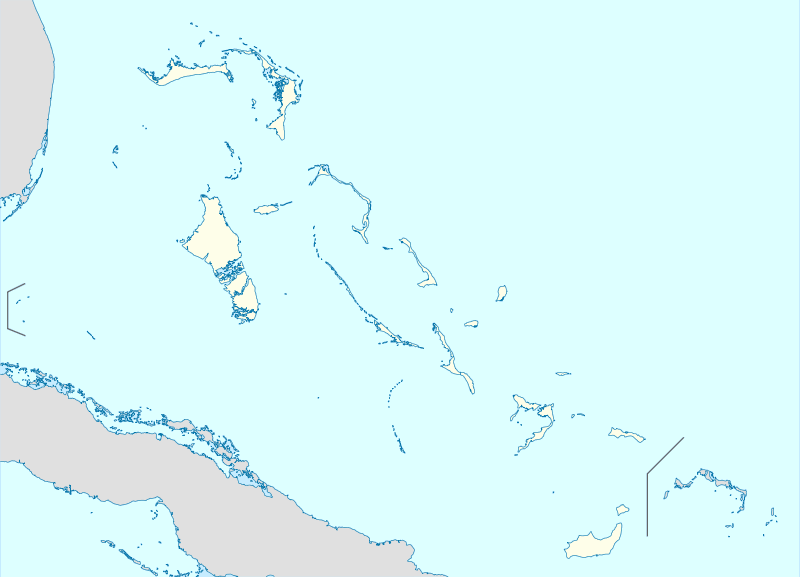

Islands of the Bahamas
Island's name	Capital (or largest settlement)	Population	Area (km^{2})
Abaco	Marsh Harbour	17,224	1,681
Acklins	Spring Point	565	497
Andros	Andros Town	7,490	5,957
Berry Islands	Nicholls Town	807	31
Bimini	Alice Town	1,988	23
Cat Island	Arthur's Town	1,522	389
Crooked Island	Colonel Hill	330	241
Eleuthera	Governor's Harbour	8,202	484
Exuma and Cays	George Town	6,928	250
Grand Bahama	Freeport City	51,368	1,373
Harbour Island	Dunmore Town	1,762	8
Inagua	Matthew Town	913	1,551
Long Island	Clarence Town	3,094	596
Mayaguana	Abraham's Bay	277	285
New Providence	Nassau	248,329	207
Ragged	Duncan Town	72	36
Rum Cay	Port Nelson	99	78
San Salvador	Cockburn Town	940	163
Spanish Wells	Spanish Wells	1,551	26
The Bahamas	Nassau	351,461	13,943

== See also ==
- Chief Councillor
- Hope Town District Council
- List of National Assembly constituencies of The Bahamas
- ISO 3166-2:BS
- List of Caribbean First-level Subdivisions by Total Area
- List of newspapers in the Bahamas
- Commonwealth Local Government Forum-Americas
