= Rum Cay =

Rum Cay Mamana
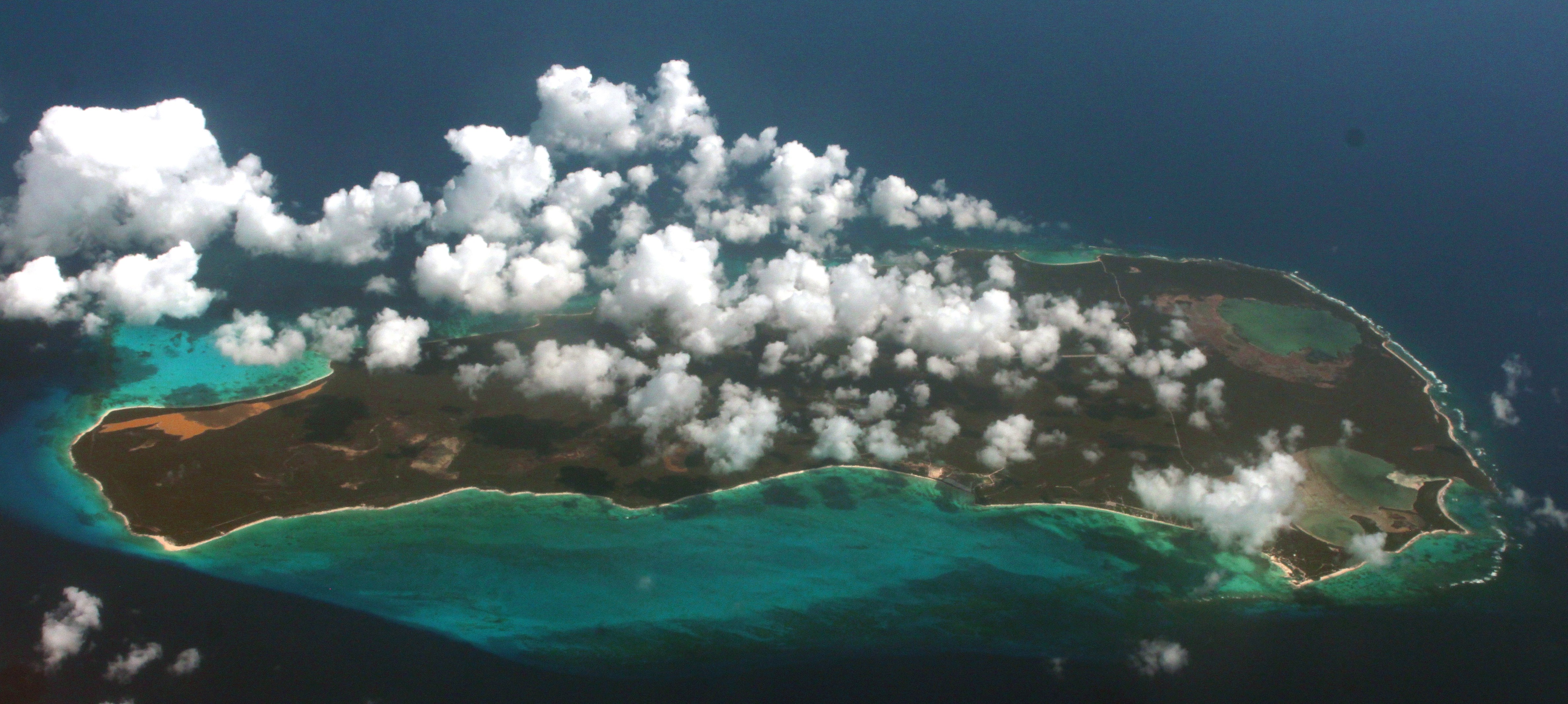

- Coordinates: 23°40′26″N 74°52′16″W
- Country: The Bahamas
- Island: Rum Cay
- Established: 1996

Government
  - Type: District Council

Area
  - Total: 78 km^{2} (30 sq mi)
- Elevation: 37 m (121 ft)

Population (2022)
  - Total: 90
  - Density: 1.2/km^{2} (3.0/sq mi)
- Time zone: UTC−5 (EST)
  - Summer (DST): UTC−4 (EDT)

Rum Cay (formerly known as Mamana and Santa Maria de la Concepción) is an island and district of The Bahamas. It measures 30 square miles (78 km^{2}) in area. It is located at Lat.: N23 42' 30" – Long.: W 74 50' 00". It has many rolling hills that rise to about 120 feet (37 m).

The main settlement is Port Nelson. Its population was recorded as 90 as of 2022. Before 1996 the island was part of a combined district of San Salvador and Rum Cay.

== Location ==
Rum Cay is 20 miles (32 km) southwest of San Salvador Island.

== History ==
=== Aboriginals ===
Rum Cay was called Mamana (or Manigua), meaning "mid waters land", by the native Lucayans. In the north there is a cave containing Lucayan drawings and carvings. Various artifacts from the Arawak period have been found by farmers in the fertile soil, which the natives enriched with bat guano.

=== Spanish ===
Some writers, such as Samuel Eliot Morison, identified Rum Cay as the site of one of Christopher Columbus's landfalls during his 1492 voyage, as the island Columbus called Santa María de la Concepción. However, a variety of other historians, geographers, and other writers identify that island as corresponding to different islands in the Bahamas or Caicos.

== Transportation ==
The island is served by Port Nelson Airport.
