= Harbour Island, Bahamas =

Island and district in Bahamas

District of Harbour Island
- Nickname: Briland
- Coordinates: 25°30′N 76°38′W
- Country: Bahamas

Government
  - Type: District Council

Population (2022)
  - Total: 1,861
- Time zone: UTC−5 (EST)
  - Summer (DST): UTC−4 (EDT)
- Area code: 242

Harbour Island is an island and administrative district in the Bahamas located off the northeast coast of Eleuthera Island. Harbour Island, Jacobs Island, Man Island, Pierre Island and others form what looks like a reef that encloses the east and north sides of a lagoon in the northeast corner of Eleuthera. It has a population of 1,762 as of the 2010 census. The only town on the island is Dunmore Town, named after the governor of the Bahamas from 1786 to 1798, John Murray, 4th Earl of Dunmore, who had a summer residence on Harbour Island.

== Tourism ==
Harbour Island is known for its pink sand beaches, which are found all along the east side of the island. The pink hue comes from a species of foraminifera, a microscopic organism that actually has a reddish-pink shell. Harbour Island is a popular vacation destination for Americans. Known as Briland to the locals, the island features English Colonial-style architecture. Harbour Island is part of the Out Islands of the Bahamas.

In the mid-1960s, American actor Brett King and his wife, Sharon, established the Coral Sands Hotel in Harbour Island.

== Transportation ==
The island is accessible by airplane through North Eleuthera Airport, followed by a short water taxi ride from neighbouring North Eleuthera.

== Gallery ==
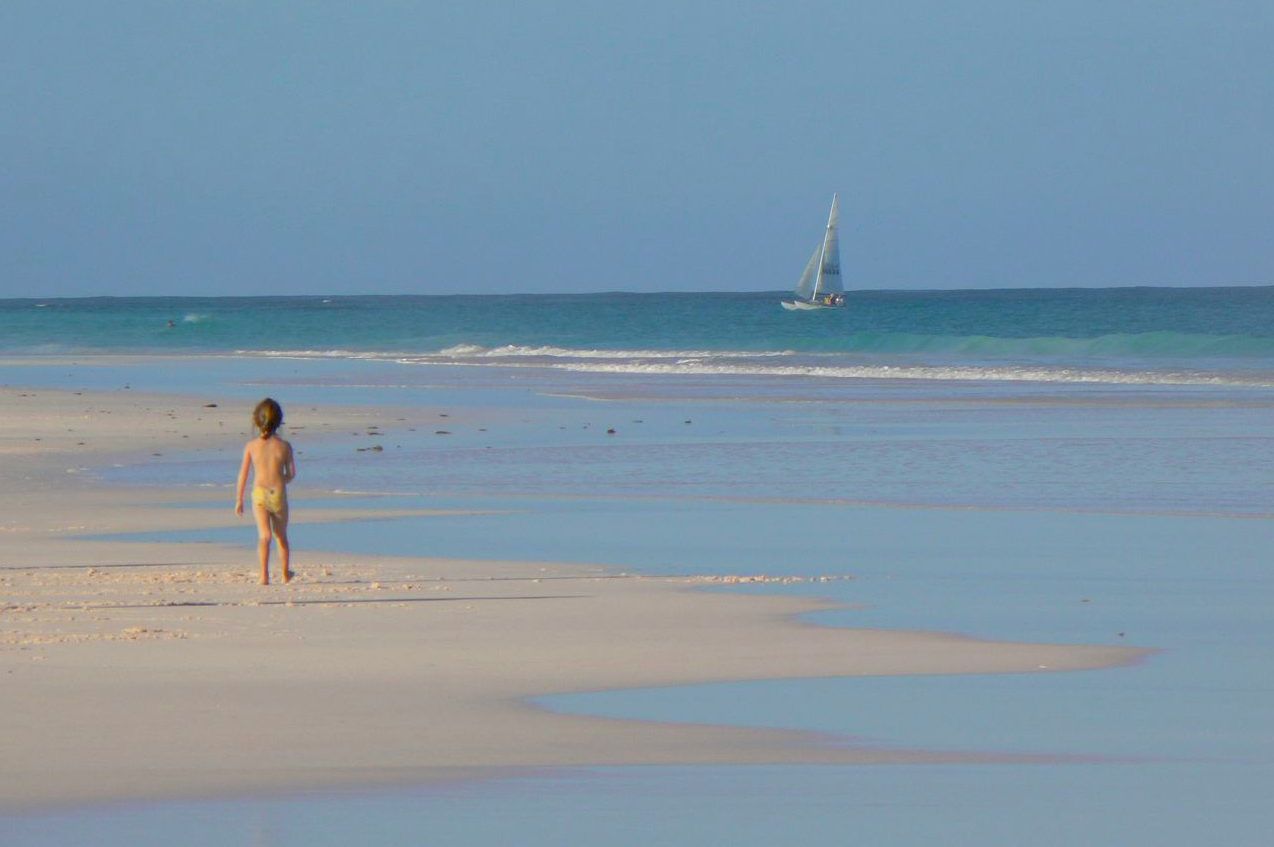
Pink sand beach near Sip Sip's, Harbour Island, looking north

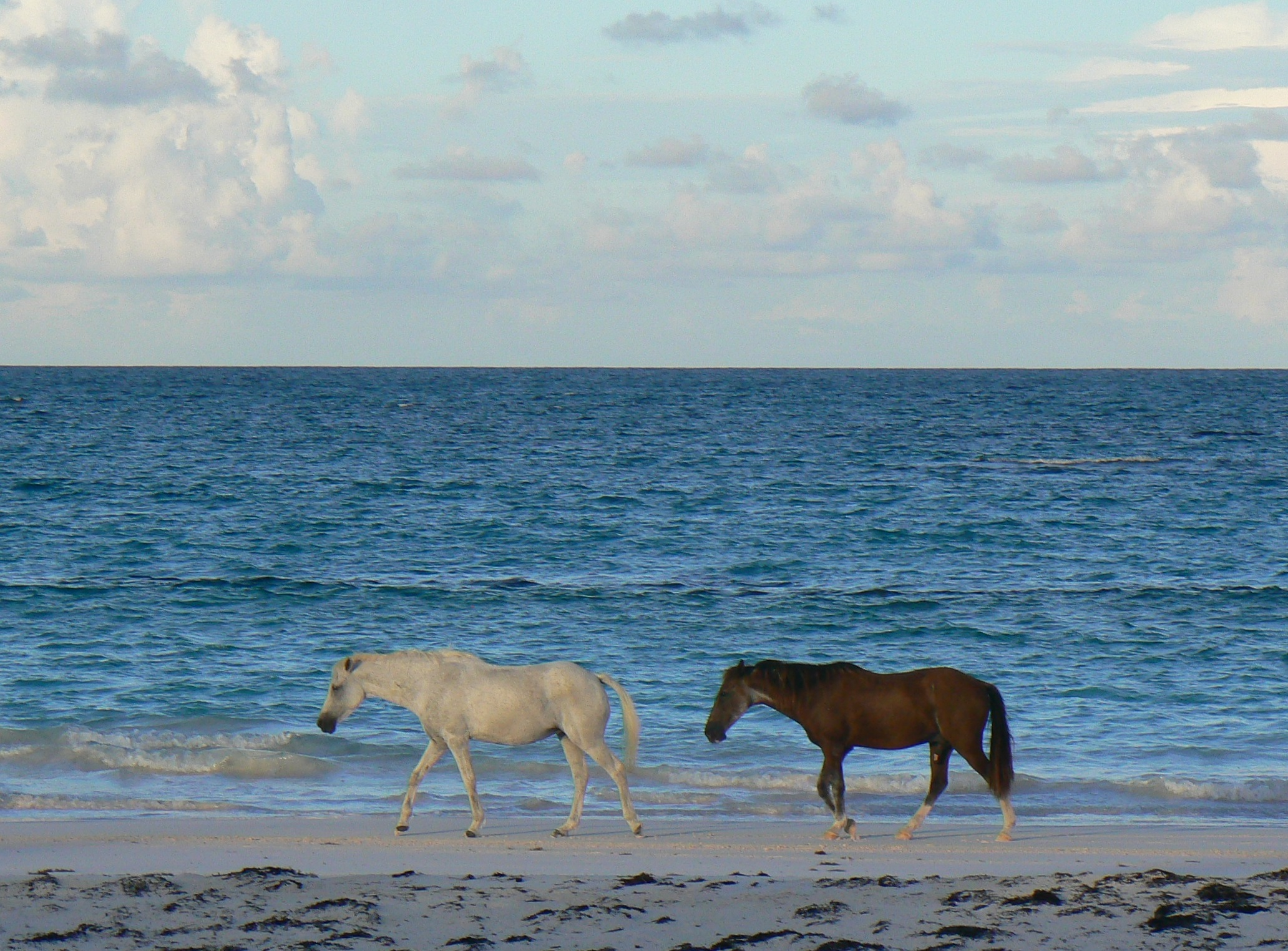
Horses on Harbour Island, looking east

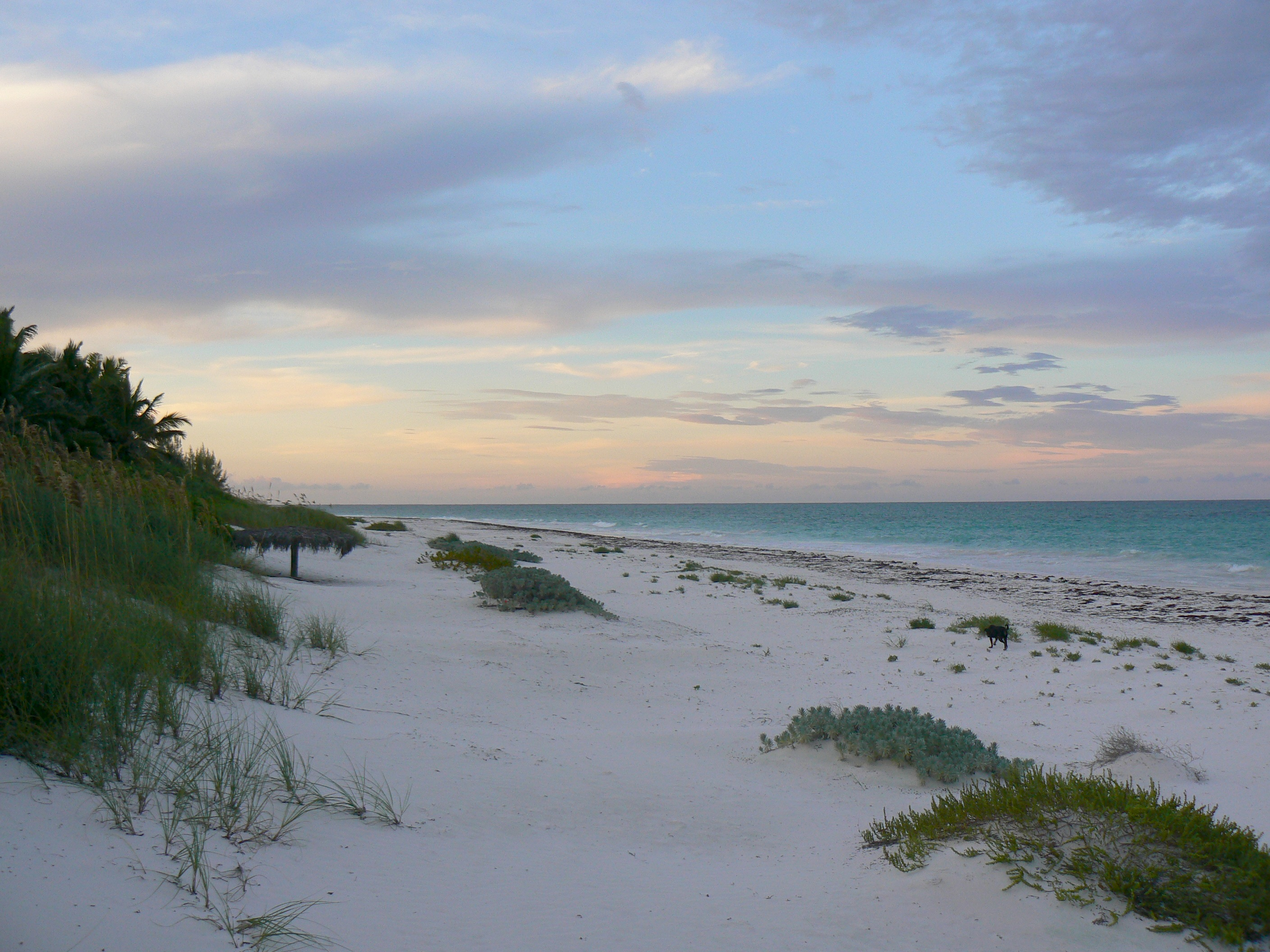
Sunset on Harbour Island, looking north

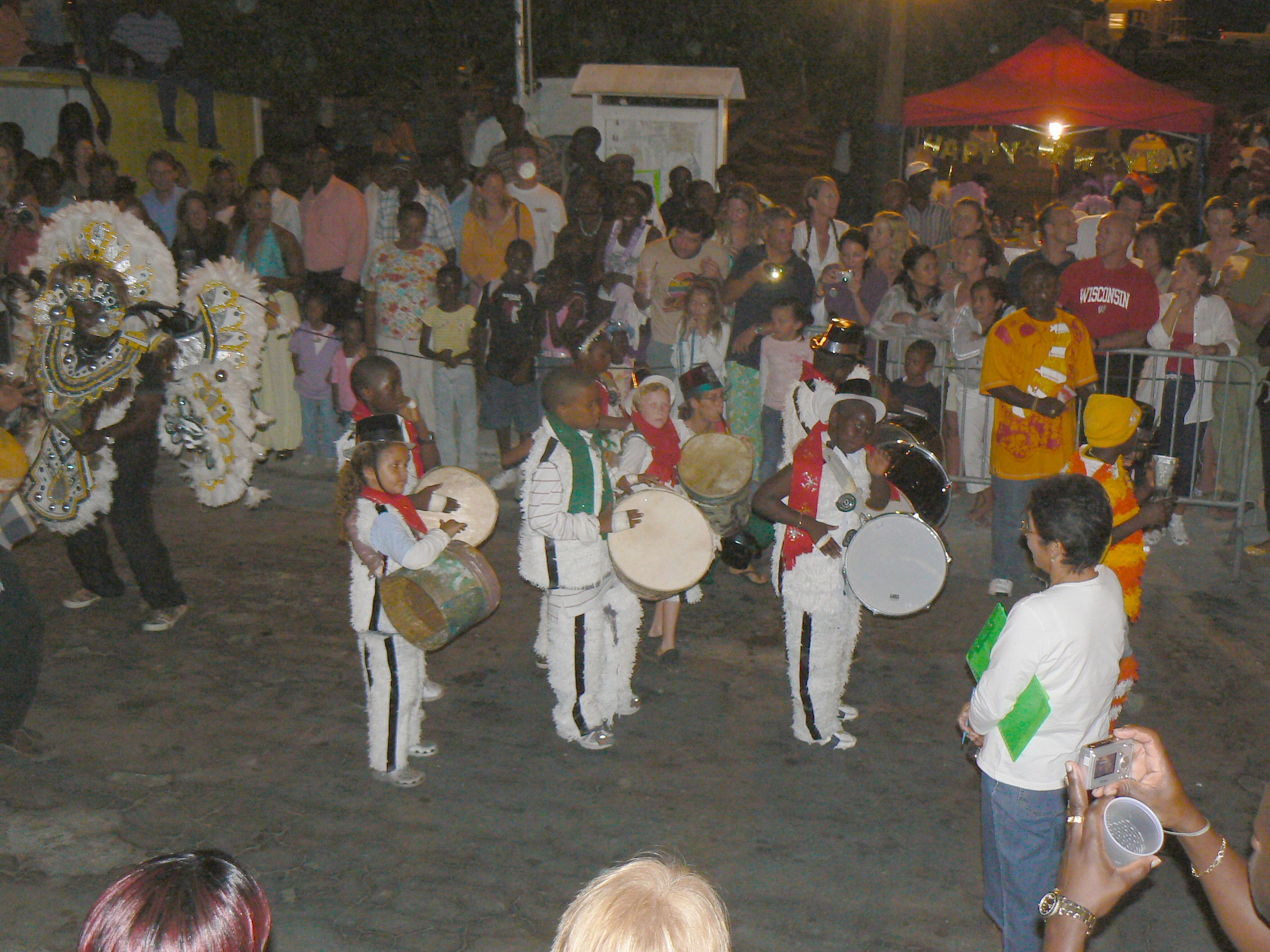
Dunmore School children at Junkanoo 2008, Harbour Island, looking east

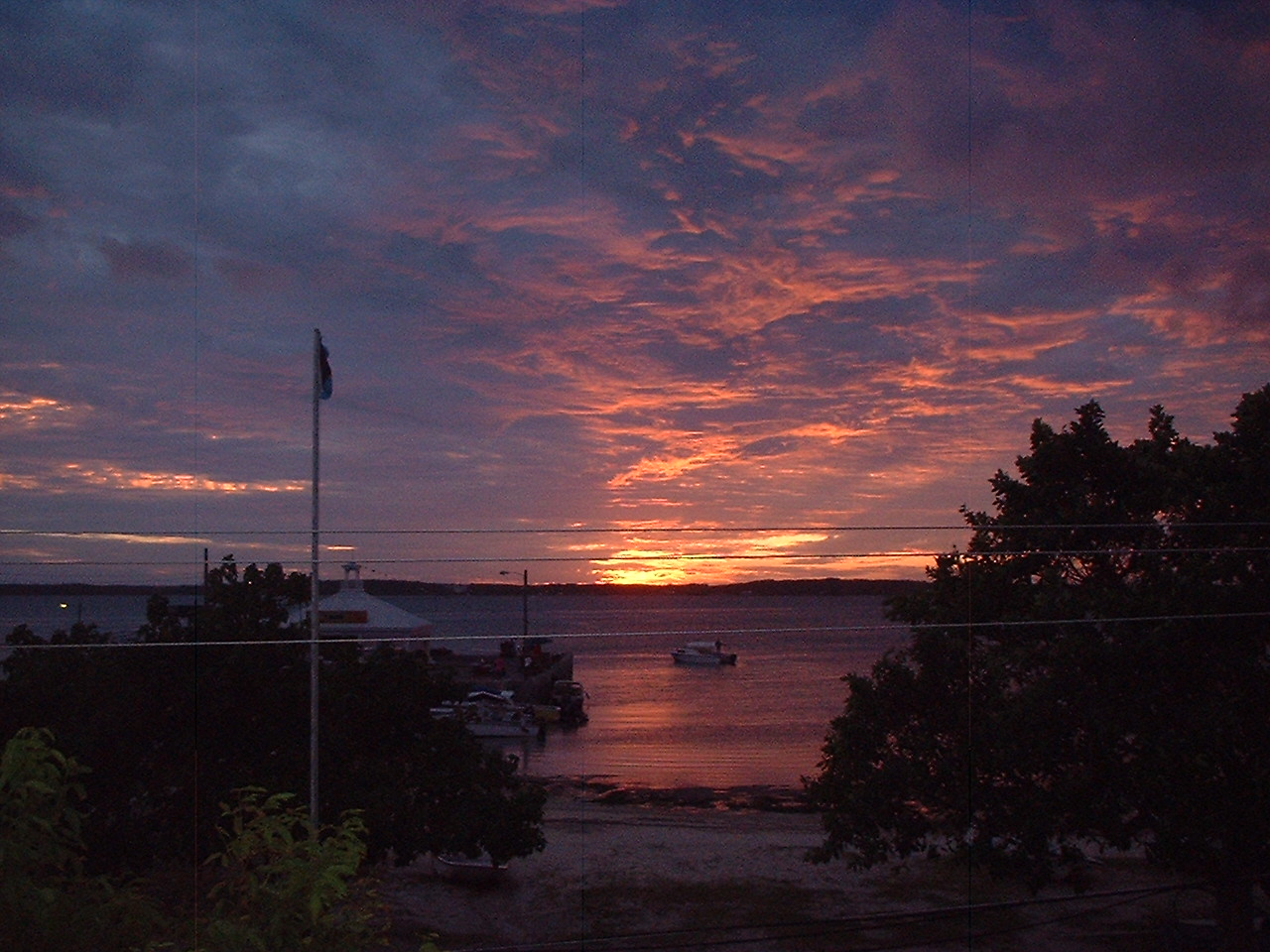
Sunset over Government Dock and harbour, Harbour Island, looking west from Dunmore School

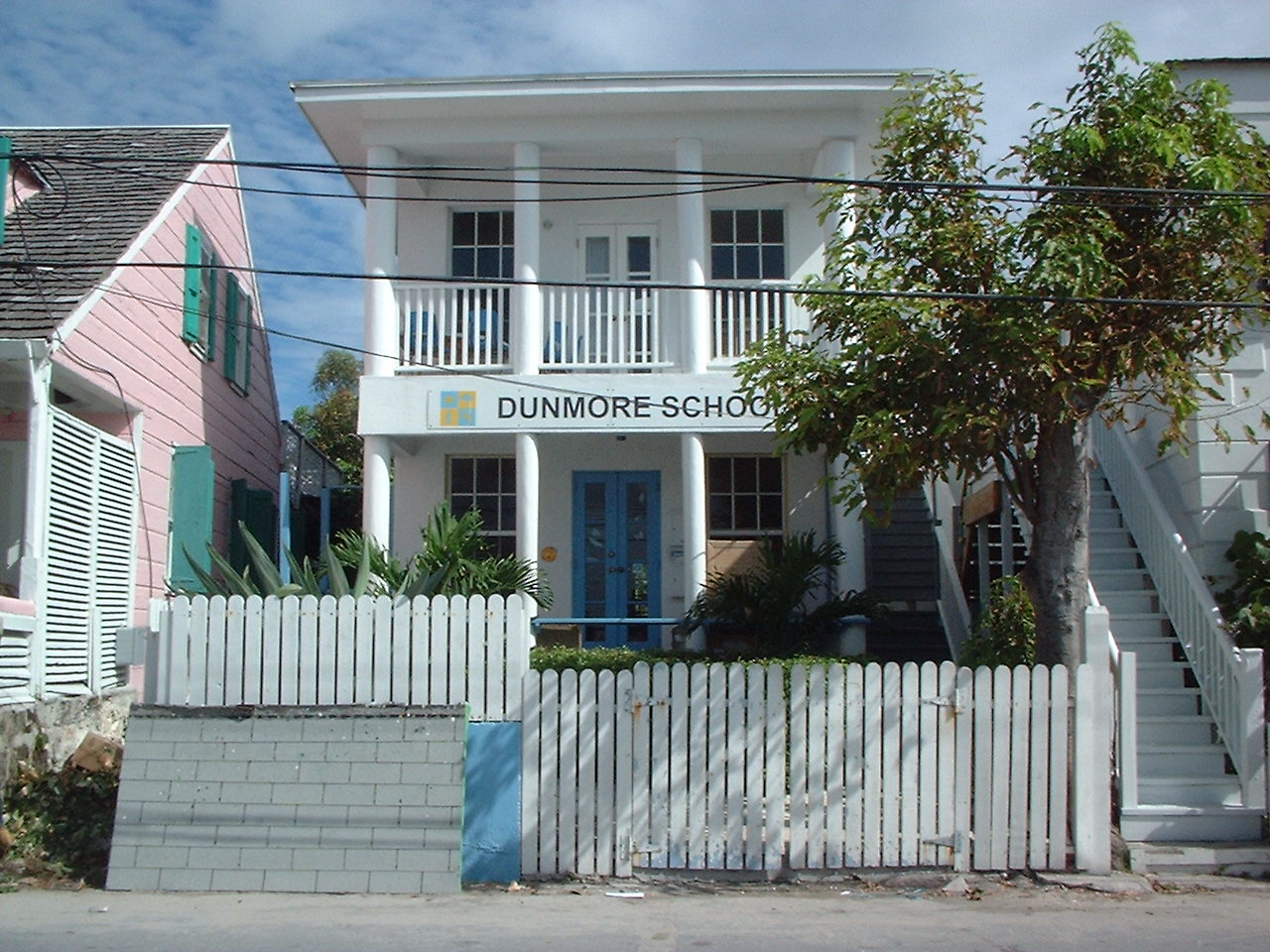
Dunmore School of Harbour Island, looking east from harbour shoreline

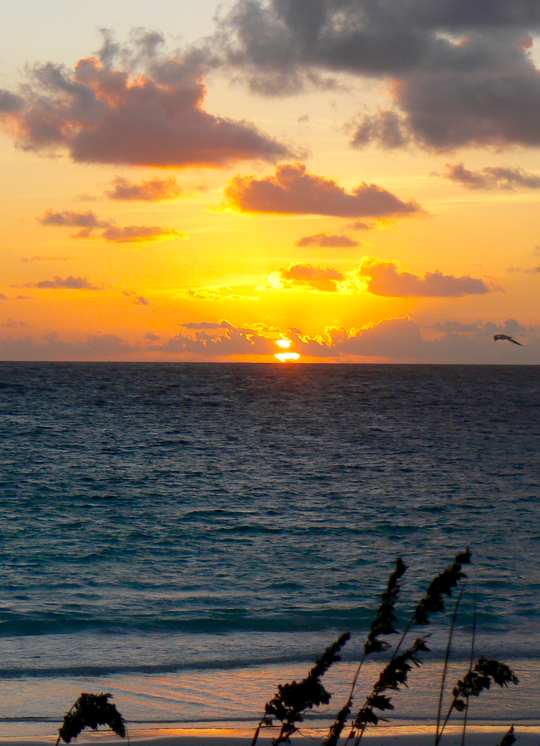
Sunrise from the north part of the island

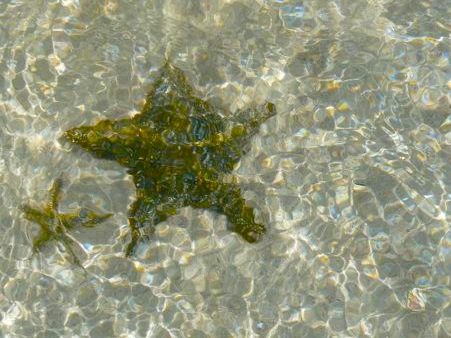
Starfish in the harbour on Harbour Island
