= Mayaguana =

District of Mayaguana
- Island and district
- Coordinates: 22°23′N 72°57′W
- Country: The Bahamas
- Island: Mayaguana

Government
  - Type: District Council

Area
  - Total: 280 km^{2} (110 sq mi)

Population (2022)
  - Total: 208
  - Density: 0.74/km^{2} (1.9/sq mi)
- Time zone: UTC−05:00 (EST)
  - Summer (DST): UTC−04:00 (EDT)
- Area code: 242

Mayaguana (from Lucayan language Mayaguana, meaning "Lesser Midwestern Land") is the easternmost island and district of The Bahamas. Its population was 277 in the 2010 census. It has an area of about 280 km^{2} (110 sq mi).

About 100 km (62 mi) north of Great Inagua and 560 km (350 mi) southeast of the capital Nassau, Mayaguana is considered the halfway point between South Florida and Puerto Rico and is about 830 km (520 mi) off Palm Beach, Florida. It is a popular stopover for boaters en-route to the eastern Caribbean.

== Etymology ==
The Indigenous Lucayan people (Taíno) named the island Mayaguana (or Mariguana) meaning "lesser mid-western land".

== History ==
Mayaguana was inhabited by Lucayans (Taíno) prior to the arrival of the Spanish following 1492. After the last of the Lucayans were carried off to Hispaniola by the Spanish early in the 16th century, the island remained uninhabited until 1812, when people began to migrate from the Turks and Caicos Islands, which are located about 100 km (62 mi) southeast.

The Brazilian historian Francisco Adolfo de Varnhagen suggested in 1864 and was later supported by The Marquis de Belloy in 1877 that Mayaguana is Guanahani, the first island visited by Christopher Columbus at his discovery of the Americas. The theory has found little support among later historians, although a 2026 analysis by Graham Balch argues in its favor. Mayaguana apparently was the Lucayan name (meaning "Lesser Midwestern Land" ) for the island.

The first steamship to circumnavigate the globe, the Royal Navy sloop HMS Driver, wrecked on Mayaguana on 3 August 1861, 14 years after the completion of her epic voyage in 1847.

During NASA's Project Mercury and the Apollo program, the United States space program had a missile tracking station on what is now Mayaguana Airport. The station was used to help keep astronauts on course. The Mayaguana Airport was built by US Army Engineers attached to the US Air Force. The airport was built as a runway for jet planes that would follow missiles fired from Cape Canaveral. Real-time sighting and photography was the best technology of the time for observing the flight of the missiles.

The Bahamian government has recently approved working with American investors MMC to turn Mayaguana into a "free trade zone," complete with tourism development of approximately 14% of the island. Actually, this is 14% of the total landmass but essentially most of the coastal region. The proposal was met with moderate resistance by Mayaguanians, who look forward to economic expansion but are unsure of what change is to come. This development is still in a planning phase and is trying to maintain the nature of the island as a quiet eco-tourist destination while still creating sustainable economic growth.

== People ==
The largest settlement is Abraham's Bay (pop. 143); other settlements are the neighboring Betsy Bay on the island's east coast (pop. 44) and Pirate's Well (pop. 90) in the north with the population slowly decreasing. The uninhabited areas of Upper Point (north shore), Northeast Point, and Southeast Point are largely inaccessible by road.

== Culture ==
The Betsy Bay Homecoming Festival is held annually in Mayaguana. As of 2020, the All Mayaguana Regatta was also held annually in Mayaguana.

== Economy ==
The least developed Bahamian island, Mayaguana has never really seen major growth largely due to the government taking little interest in the economy. However, the government has provided some locals with entry-level positions at various government offices while the local government does its best to provide local jobs. Others make a living by either fishing, farming, petty shops or home businesses, although few.

Considered the most isolated Bahamian island, Mayaguana uses the country's mail boat system as its primary form of import and export. Mayaguana is scheduled once a week for delivery and pickup by M/V Lady Rosalind II.

As of 2019, Mayaguana did not have a bank, or even an ATM. Money transfers to and from the island are by money transmission businesses, the Bahamas Postal Service, or by travelers carrying cash.

== Food ==
Mayaguana is known for fresh sea food. Sea life regularly caught for commercial purposes include conch, grouper, spiny lobster, snappers and tuna. Marlin and bone fish found in Bahamian waters are fished for sporting activities only.

== Environment ==
Mayaguana is known for its woody terrain. Bahamian dry forests' hardwoods, common lignum-vitae (Guaiacum officinale), and holywood lignum-vitae (G. sanctum) can be found throughout the island. The island is home to several government nature reserves.

As the southeasternmost island in the Bahamian Commonwealth, Mayaguana is bordered to its east by deep waters of the Atlantic Ocean. Offshore, there are many underwater coral reefs, as well as shipwrecks.

Mayaguana is home to the Bahamian flamingo (Phoenicopterus ruber), Bartsch's iguanas, plovers, terns, and osprey. Nesting sea turtles can be found throughout the undeveloped northern part of the island. About 118 species of bird are found on the island, including two large brown booby colonies.

== Tourism ==
Mayaguana is one of the less densely developed islands of the Bahamas. Tourism on the island includes recreational activities such as scuba diving, bonefishing, snorkeling, bird watching and off-trail biking. The eastern part of the island is also used for crabbing.

Ecotourism is also a growing spectrum. Booby Cay is home to hundreds of iguanas indigenous only to Mayaguana. There is also an interesting species of booby birds that is also found on a separate cay on the northern side of Mayaguana. Blackwood Point, located in upper Pirates Well is where the Bahamian flamingo can be found feeding year round.

The island is accessible by the Mayaguana Airport (MYG), which is located southeast of Abraham's Bay and is visited by Bahamasair as well as private aircraft. New construction is set to take place at the Mayaguana Airport before the fourth quarter of 2017.

== Politics ==
The island is part of the MICAL constituency for elections to the House of Assembly of the Bahamas.
