= The Bahamas Local Government Act 1996 =

The Bahamas Local Government Act of 1996 is a piece of legislation of the Bahamas.

In 1996, the Bahamian Parliament passed "The Local Government Act" to facilitate the establishment of Family Island Administrators, Local Government Districts, Local District Councillors, and Local Town Committees for the various island communities. The overall goal of this act is to allow the various elected leaders to govern and oversee the affairs of their respective districts without the interference of Central Government. In total, there are 31 districts, with elections being held every three years. There are also one hundred and ten Councillors and two hundred and eighty-one Town Committee members to correspond with the various districts.

Each Councillor or Town Committee member is responsible for the proper use of public funds for the maintenance and development of their district.

== See also ==
- Districts of the Bahamas
- Bahamian Parliament
