= Inagua =

Coordinates: 21°13′04″N 73°15′05″W

District of Inagua
- District
- Country: (The Bahamas) Bahamas
- Island: Great Inagua

Government
  - Type: District Councils
  - Chief Councillor: Latoya Palacious
  - Deputy Chief Councillor: Bertram Ingraham
  - Island Administrator: Quenna Gibson

Area
  - Total: 1,679 km^{2} (648 sq mi)

Population (2022)
  - Total: 856
  - Density: 0.510/km^{2} (1.32/sq mi)
- Time zone: UTC−5 (EST)
  - Summer (DST): UTC−4 (EDT)
- Area code: 242

Inagua is the southernmost district of the Bahamas, comprising the islands of Great Inagua and Little Inagua. The headquarters for the district council are in Matthew Town.

== History ==
The original settlers were the Lucayan people (Taíno), who arrived sometime between 500 and 800 CE, crossing in dugout canoes from Hispaniola and/or Cuba to the Bahamas.

The larger island was initially called by the name Heneagua, which may derive from a Spanish expression meaning 'water is to be found there'. Two names of apparent Lucayan origin, Inagua (meaning "Small Eastern Island") and Baneque (meaning "Big Water Island"), were used by the Spanish to refer to Great Inagua.

Between the years of 1500 and 1825, many documented treasure laden ships were destroyed on Inaguan reefs. The two most valuable wrecks lost off the Inaguas were treasure-laden Spanish galleons: the Santa Rosa in 1599; and the Infanta in 1788. Other ships of considerable value that were wrecked there include the French Le Count De Paix in 1713, the British HMS Lowestoffe in 1801, and the British HMS Statira in 1815.

As early as the 1600s, salt was being produced and shipped to Spanish colonies, and its extraction was a going business by 1803.

Henri Christophe, king of northern Haiti from 1811 to 1820, built a summer retreat at the Northeast Point of Great Inagua. Local legend has it that he also buried a cache of gold there.

By 1918, after the end of World War I, lower salt prices and competition had driven the small producers on Great Inagua out of business, and the salt works were abandoned except for incidental local use.

In 1935, the Erickson brothers from Massachusetts founded West India Chemicals Ltd., purchasing the abandoned salt works from the British government. They drilled test holes, set up offices, and began restoration of the buildings, but the locals felt threatened, fearing changes to the power structure status quo. In August 1937, a riot broke out, an employee was killed, and the Ericksons were forced to flee. They soon returned, and full-scale development resumed.

In the mid-1950s, Morton Salt bought the Great Inagua saltworks, which includes over 80 salt ponds, now the second largest such operation in North America. Morton is the major employer on the island.

== Islands ==
=== Great Inagua ===
Great Inagua is the second largest island in the Bahamas at 596 sq mi (1544 km^{2}), it is 4 times smaller then Andros, the largest island in the Bahamas. It lies about 55 miles (89 kilometres) from the eastern tip of Cuba. The island is about 55 by 19 mi (89 by 31 km) in extent and mostly flat with some sand hills, the highest points being East Hill at 132 ft (40 m), Salt Pond Hill at 102 ft (31 m), and James Hill at 90 ft (27 m). It encloses several lakes, most notably the 12-mile (19 km) long Lake Windsor (also called Lake Rosa) which occupies nearly a quarter of the interior. The population of Great Inagua is 913 (2010 census).

The island's capital and only harbour is Matthew Town, named after George Matthew, a 19th-century Governor of the Bahamas. This town houses the Morton Salt Company’s main facility, producing one million tonnes of sea salt a year — the second largest solar saline operation in North America and Inagua's main industry.

Great Inagua Airport (IATA: IGA, ICAO: MYIG) is located nearby.

A large bird sanctuary in the centre of the island has a population of more than 80,000 West Indian flamingoes and many other bird species, including the Bahama parrot, Inagua woodstar, Bahama pintail, brown pelican, tricolored heron, snowy egret, reddish egret, stripe-headed tanager, double-crested cormorant, Neotropic cormorant, roseate spoonbill, American kestrel, and burrowing owl. The Union Creek National Reserve is specially set aside for the study of green sea turtles (Chelonia mydas).

=== Little Inagua ===
The neighbouring Little Inagua, 8 km (5 mi; 4 nmi) to the northeast, is uninhabited and occupied by a large Land and Sea Park. It has an area of 30 sq mi (78 km^{2}), with herds of feral donkeys and goats (descendants of stock introduced by the French). Various species of endangered sea turtles breed on the island. Little Inagua has a large protective reef extending up to 1 mile (1,600 m) away from the island in all directions, which prevents boats from coming too close.

== Politics ==
Local administration in Inagua is managed through the Inagua District Council, operating under the provisions of the Local Government Act of The Bahamas."Local Government Act" (PDF). Government of The Bahamas.. The council is composed of seven democratically elected councillors chosen by members of the community within the district of Inagua. The body is headed by a Chief Councillor and assisted by a Deputy Chief Councillor, overseeing municipal services, infrastructural upkeep, and community development initiatives across Matthew Town and the wider island.

Inagua has achieved several notable milestones in its local governance history. In 2017, the district council became the first in the country to elect two women to its top executive offices simultaneously, with Amapola Lindo-Hanchell serving as Chief Councillor and Gabrielle Nixon as Deputy Chief Councillor. Following this, the 2022 local government elections saw the selection of the youngest leadership pairing in Bahamian history, consisting of 26-year-old Chief Councillor Kennard Rolle and 23-year-old Deputy Chief Councillor Dometrius Taylor. Consequently, this marked the milestone of Dometrius Taylor becoming the youngest Deputy Chief Councillor ever recorded in Bahamian history at age 23."Local Government 2022 FORM R Results". Parliamentary Registration Department of The Bahamas.

At the national level, the island is part of the MICAL constituency for elections to the House of Assembly of the Bahamas. While the MICAL seat has historically experienced shifting margins between the Progressive Liberal Party (PLP) and the Free National Movement (FNM), Inagua has remained a steadfast base of support for the FNM. The constituency is represented in the House of Assembly by FNM Member of Parliament James Leo Ferguson, a former Assistant Superintendent of Police and Officer-in-Charge of the Great Inagua Division, and the son of former FNM Senator Johnlee Ferguson.Scott, Rachel (2021-05-31). "Moultrie: MICAL should be two seats". The Nassau Guardian.

== Gallery ==
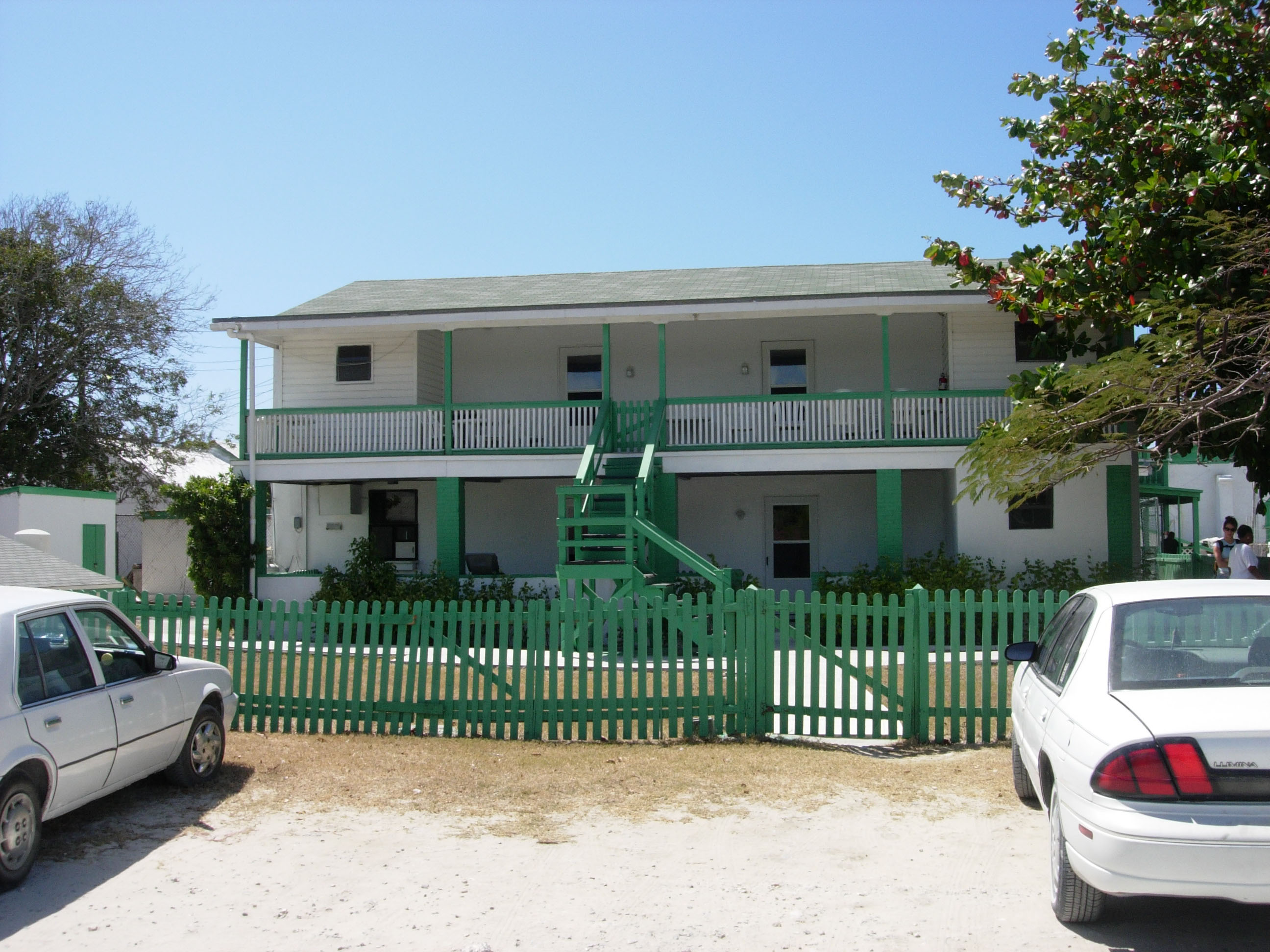
Main Guest House in Matthew Town, Great Inagua

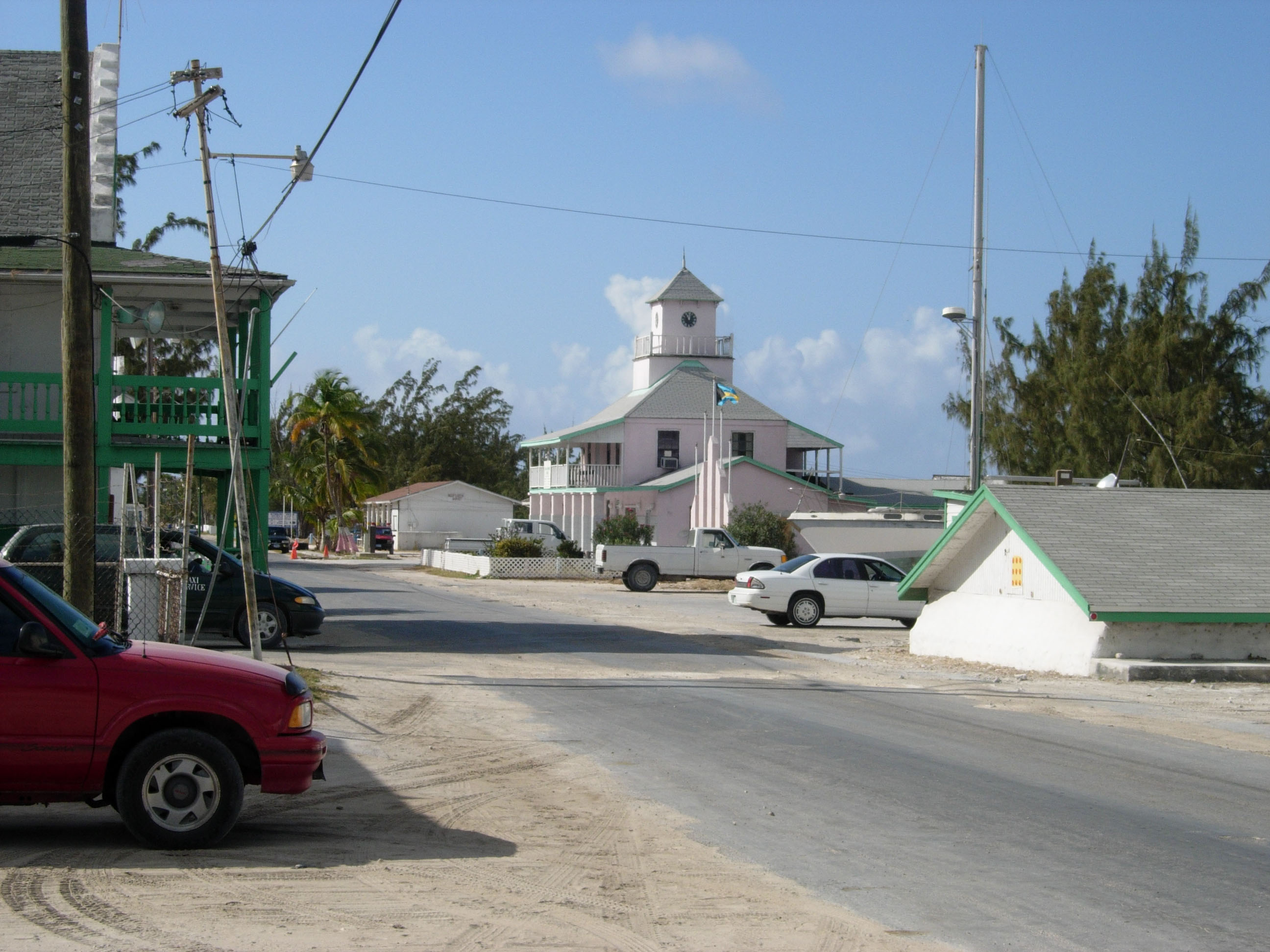
Downtown Matthew Town, Great Inagua

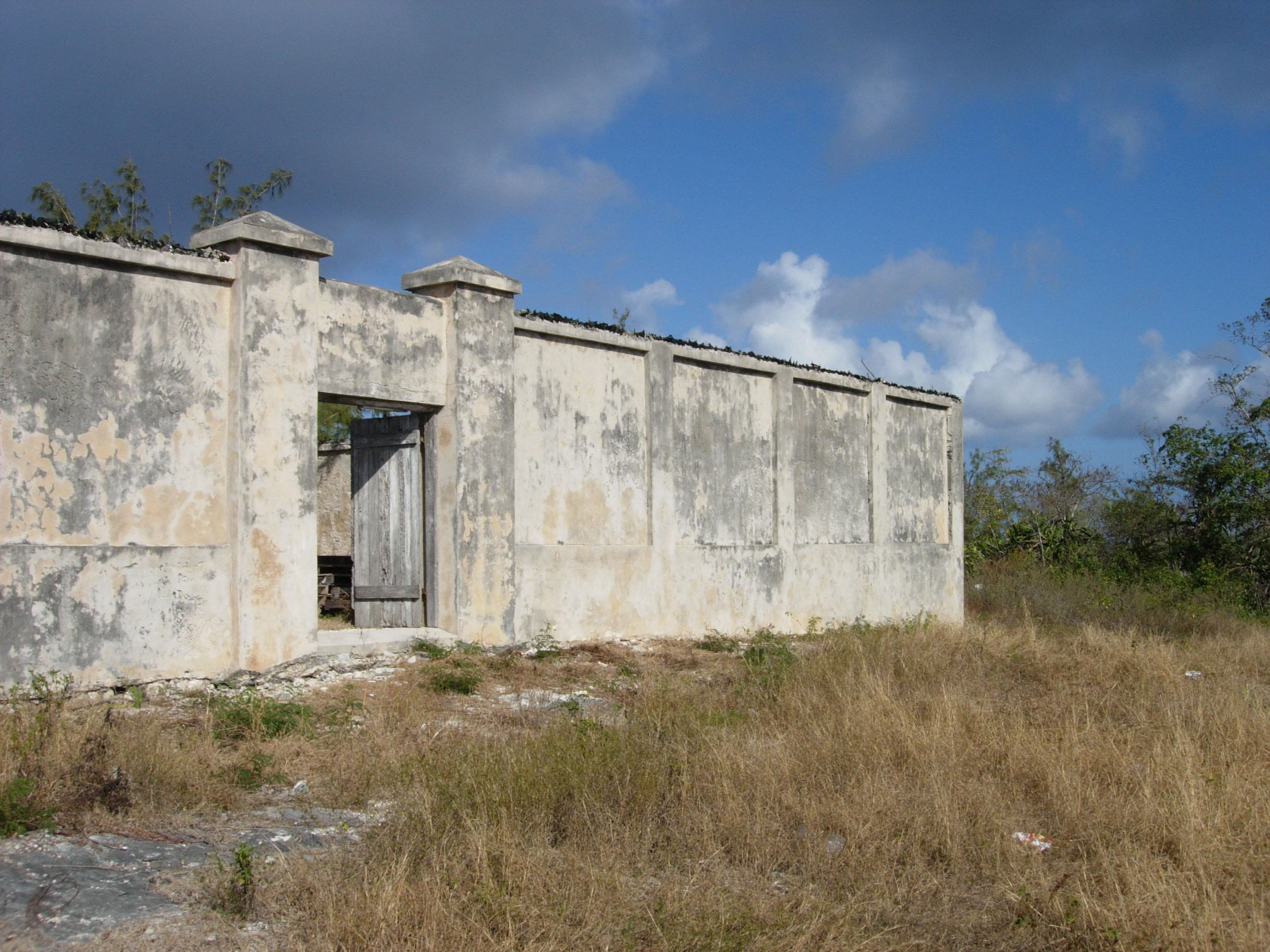
Old disused prison, Matthew Town, Great Inagua

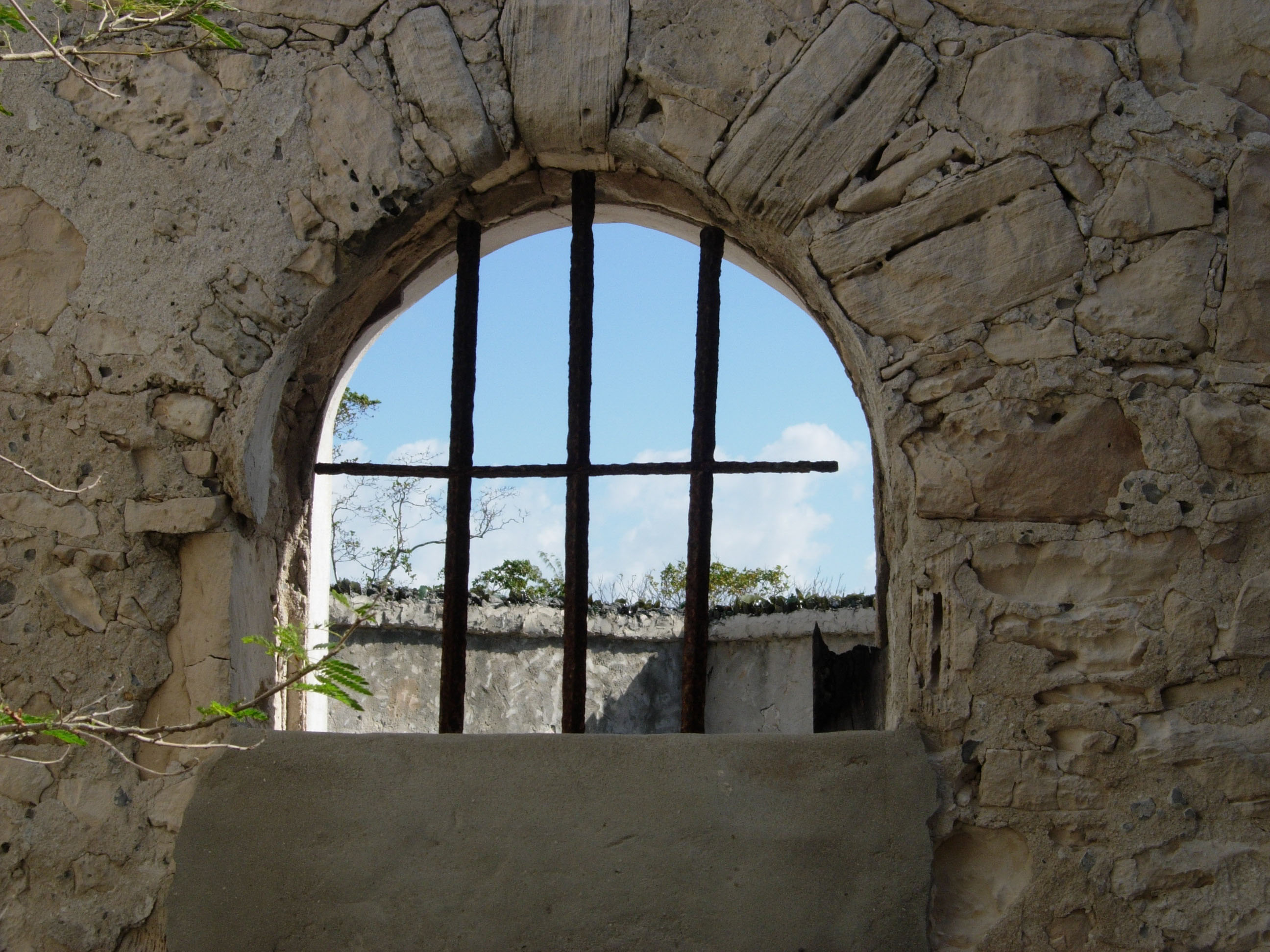
Window in old prison, Matthew Town, Great Inagua

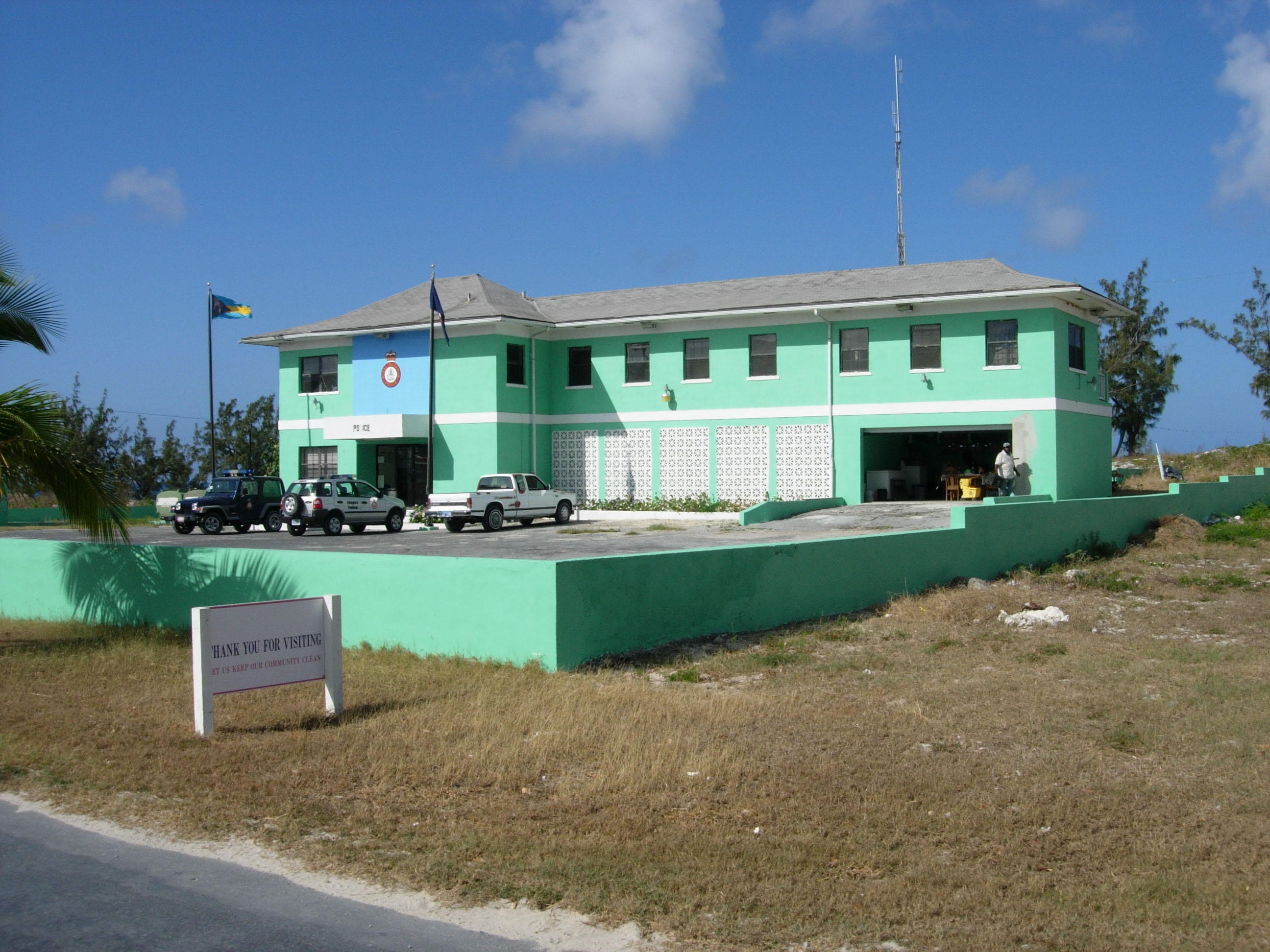
Modern police station, Matthew Town, Great Inagua

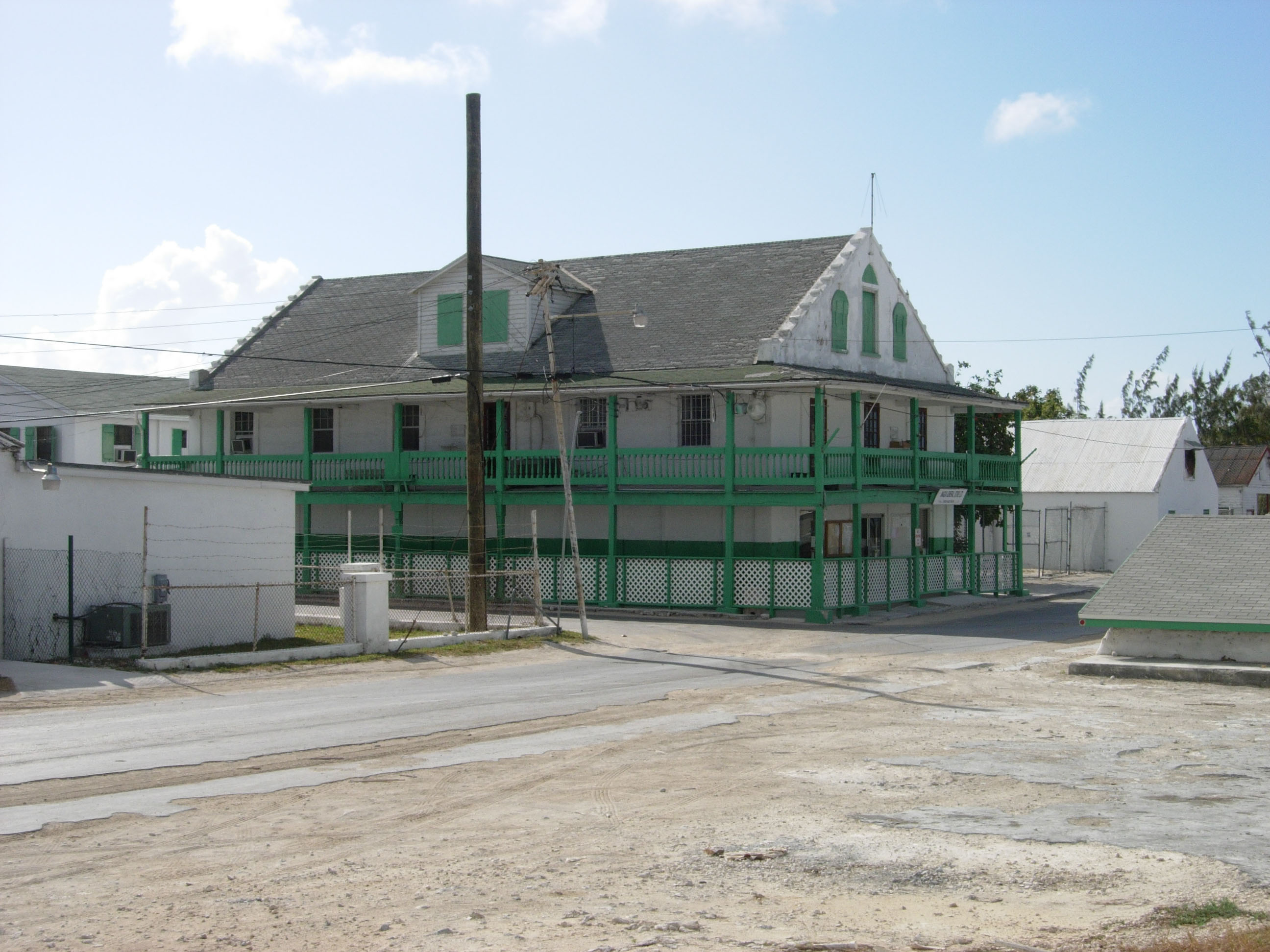
Grocery store in Matthew Town, Great Inagua

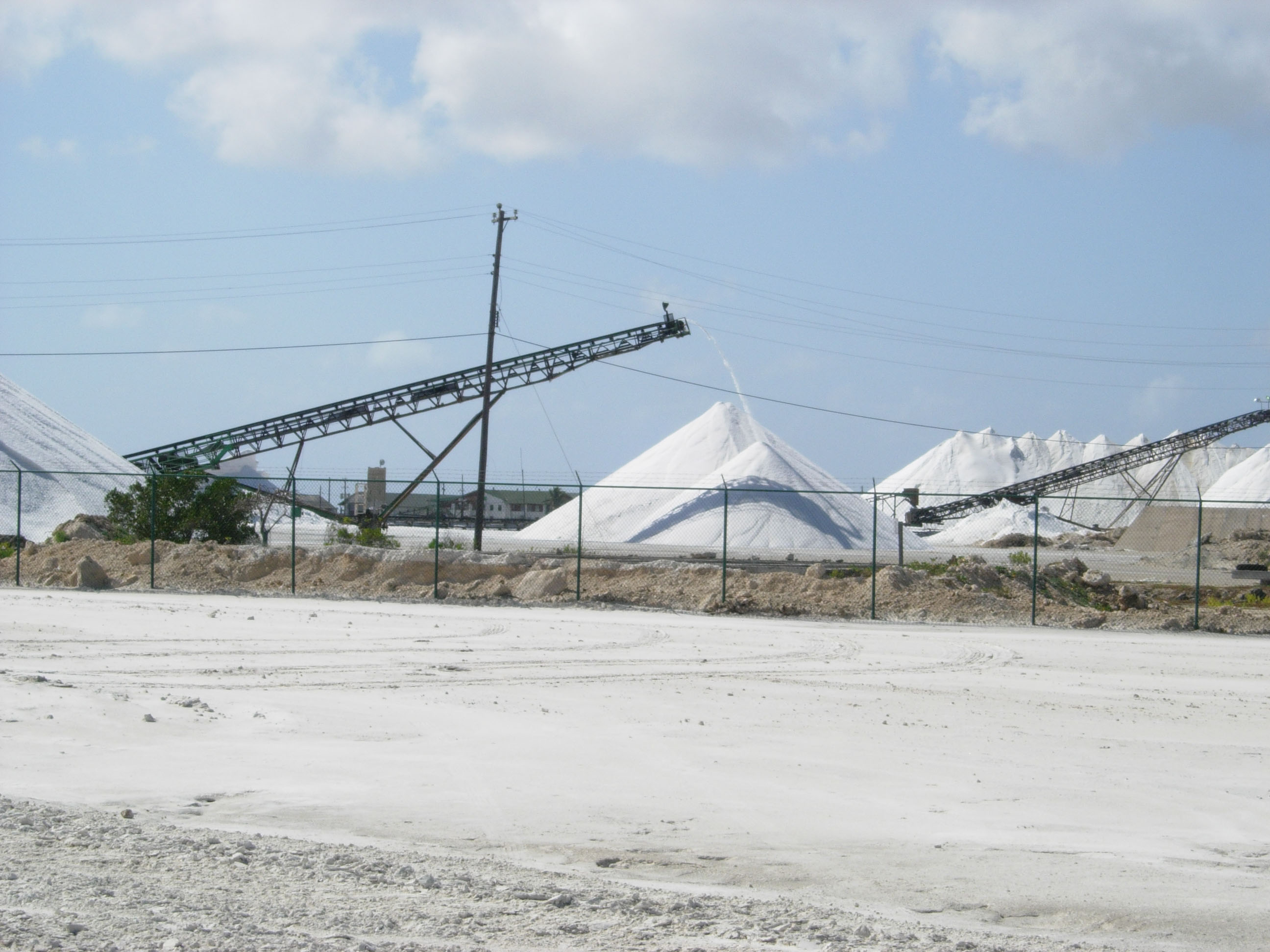
Part of the Morton Salt facilities on the north shore of Great Inagua

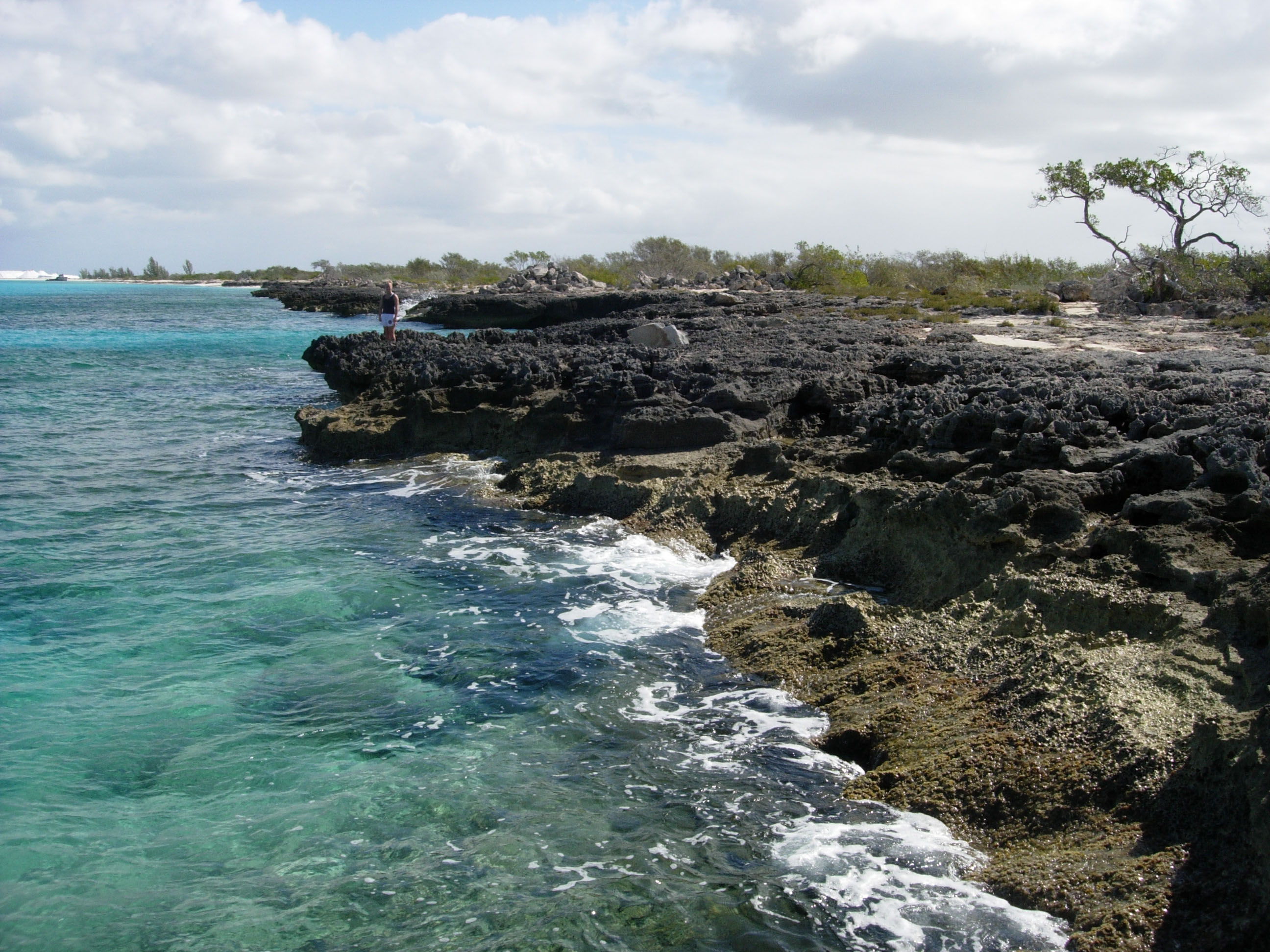
Northern rocky shore of Great Inagua exposing Pleistocene reef limestones

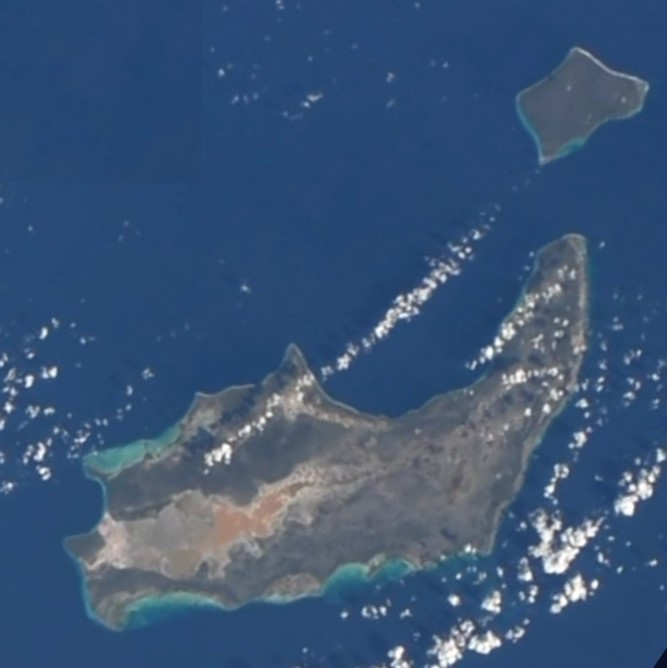
Great Inagua and Little Inagua viewed from the International Space Station on 2022-12-09
