= North Eleuthera =

District of the Bahamas

Coordinates: 25°28′N 76°41′W

The Location of the District of North Eleuthera

North Eleuthera is one of the districts of the Bahamas, on the island of Eleuthera. It had a population of 3,247 in 2010. It was established in 1648, and holds historical significance as the birthplace of The Bahamas, founded by English Puritans seeking religious freedom. North Eleuthera itself encompasses diverse landscapes of pink sand beaches and historical caves. It also serves as a gateway for visitors to nearby popular cays.

== History ==
Prior to European settlement, Eleuthera was inhabited by the Lucayan people, who were known for their peaceful disposition. However, in the 16th century, they were enslaved by the Spanish and transported to Hispaniola to work in the gold and silver mines. Eleuthera Island was founded in 1648 by a group of English Puritans, known as the Eleutheran Adventurers, led by Captain William Sayles. They sailed from Bermuda in search of religious freedom, establishing Eleuthera. The name "Eleuthera" itself is derived from the Greek word "eleuthero" or "eleuther," meaning "free" or "freedom." The Preacher's Cave in North Eleuthera holds historical importance as the site where Captain Sayles and his companions found refuge and held their religious services after being shipwrecked. A stone plaque at the entrance commemorates this event.

== Geography ==
North Eleuthera is a supervisory district on the Eleuthera Island in The Bahamas. A key geographical feature in North Eleuthera is the Glass Window Bridge. This natural formation, where a narrow 30 ft (9.1 m) strip of rock separates the deep blue waters of the Atlantic Ocean on one side from the Bight of Eleuthera on the other side. The northern part of the island has several sandy beaches with limestone cliffs along its margins. Other topographical features include cave systems like Hatchet Bay Cave and Preacher's Cave. It is a fishing hotspot, while limited farming is carried out in the southern part of the district.

== Demographics ==
According to the 2010 census, the district of North Eleuthera had a population of 3,893 people. The population consisted of 51.9% females and 48.1% males. North Eleuthera is amongst the least populated supervisory districts of The Bahamas.
