= Maria Spencer =

Petroleum geologist

Maria Spencer was a petroleum geologist. She attended the University of Oklahoma, where she obtained her master's degree in 1930. After graduating, Maria became a district geologist during the second World War. She worked in several locations throughout her career, such as Dallas, Oklahoma, California, Calgary, Amarillo, and Los Angeles, but most of her work was based out of Midland, Texas. In Midland, Spencer was a part of the Midland One project, which was a well sitting job and doing tests on wildcat wells. From there, she moved to work on Andros in the Bahamas, where she developed the Bahamas Deep Test, which focused mostly on strati-graphic testing.

== Bahamas Deep Test ==
On April 13, 1946, Maria Spencer traveled to the Bahamas to begin her work in Andros, conducting strati-graphic testing on the land. This testing was done at a location off of the eastern shore, approximately 7 miles inland. This location was picked specifically due to the lack of influence from the talus deposits that were built out from the reef, as well as minimal movement from the reef front’s tectonic waves. This included possible slumping of the land and movement in the layers of the earth. In other words, it was the most stable place to do the testing. It was noted that this location was also chosen because it allowed a complete penetration, which allowed for uncomplicated data extraction. This location yielded inconclusive geological and geophysical data at the time of its selection.

The testing continued until April 1, 1947, almost a year after the start date, reaching a depth of 14,585 ft. From this analysis, gas and oil were not found in a sufficient form. This experimental discovery paved the way for new understandings of late Cretaceous period strata. Because the depth reached was insufficient to analyze early Cretaceous strata, Maria compared it to that of strata samples taken southern Florida. It was concluded that the Cretaceous strata in Andros No. 1 consisted of small traces of anhydrite, as well as crystalline dolomite and dolomite limestone. In southern Florida, the composition of strata was anhydrite, with interbred dolomite and fossiliferous chalky limestone. One of the major differences in the strata samples from each location was the difference in the porousness of each layer. It was observed that there were minor signs of poorly developed porosity in the Florida sample, while the sample collected in Andros No. 1 showed large, thick areas of well-developed porosity.

This information allowed geologists to conclude that at approximately 14,500 ft., the well in Andros no. 1 would have reached the Early Cretaceous strata.
