= Great Bahama Canyon =

Submarine canyon system in the Bahamas

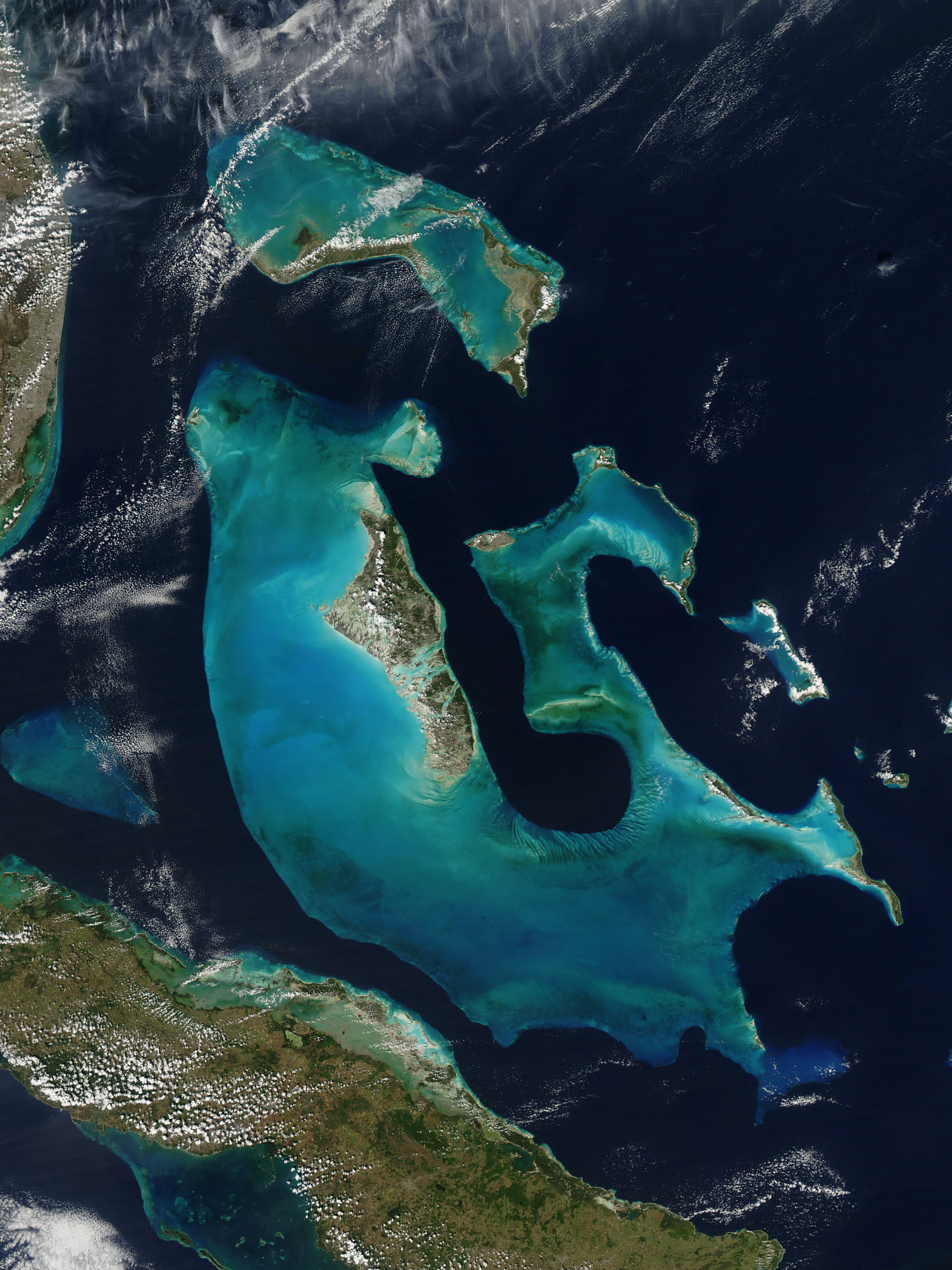
The Bahamas as seen from space. The egress of the Great Bahama Canyon into the Atlantic Ocean is the dark blue channel at upper center.

The Great Bahama Canyon is a V-shaped submarine canyon system in the Bahamas that cuts between the Abaco Islands to the north and Eleuthera island to the south. It separates the Bahama Banks and forms one of the deepest underwater canyon systems known. There are three branches: the Tongue of the Ocean running south between Andros and New Providence, and the northeast and northwest Providence Channel. The canyon walls reach heights of 5 kilometres (3 mi), taller than any canyon walls on land. This canyon system has remained open through a process of submarine erosion.
