= Congo Town =

Town on Andros Island, Bahamas

- Location within Bahamas
- Coordinates: 24°11′N 77°35′W
- Country: Bahamas
- Island: Andros Island
- District: South Andros
- First settled: Late 1800s

Population (2010)
  - Total: 90
- Time zone: UTC-5 (Eastern Time Zone)

Congo is a small village located in South Andros district, part of Andros Island in the Bahamas.

It is served by the South Andros Airport. In 2010, the population was 90.

== History ==
Freed slaves from the United States of America founded the settlement in the late 1800s.

== See also ==
- List of cities in the Bahamas
- Districts of the Bahamas
- Islands of the Bahamas
