= Kemps Bay =

Kemp's Bay
- Town
- Location within Bahamas
- Coordinates: 24.0232°N 77.5326°W
- Country: Bahamas
- Island: Andros Island
- District: South Andros

Population (2010)
  - Total: 273
- Time zone: UTC-5 (Eastern Time Zone)

Kemp's Bay is a town on the island of Andros in the Bahamas and, before 1996, was also a district of the Bahamas.

== Former district ==
The district consisted of the southern portion of the island. Its population in 2000 was 1,666 – the census recorded exactly equal numbers of males and females. The town had a population of 273 in 2010. New districts were created in Andros in 1996. The district of Kemps Bay was roughly replaced by South Andros.

== Transportation ==
The village is served by South Andros Airport.

== Economy ==
In 2002, businessmen Miko Maseratti and Michael Wilbanks visited the island and developed a plan to create infrastructure on the island to encourage economic growth. Part of the plan included turning grey water into usable water to encourage resort development. Geologists were hired to research the structure as well as city planners were hired for designing however there were no investors at the time and therefore the project was subsequently abandoned.

Kemp's Bay has a grocery, a gas station, and a boat repair shop.

Kemp's Bay is known for its bonefishing and its conch shells. The average shell on the island is the size of an American football. They are large pearly pink and can weigh as much as 15 lb. A traditional island food is the conch. It is a versatile food and can be served fried, in salad, or in soup.

Kemp's Bay has a church and a youth center. There is no economy on the island, therefore many children grow up only to leave the island to seek work.

Homecoming festivals are a period for family island reunions when persons from each island community are encouraged to return to their roots and renew family and community ties. The festival also serves to promote community spirit and offer a venue for exposure to the culture and culinary talents of persons in the community.
