= Rexy Rolle =

Bahamian attorney, airline executive and singer

Sherrexcia "Rexy" Rolle
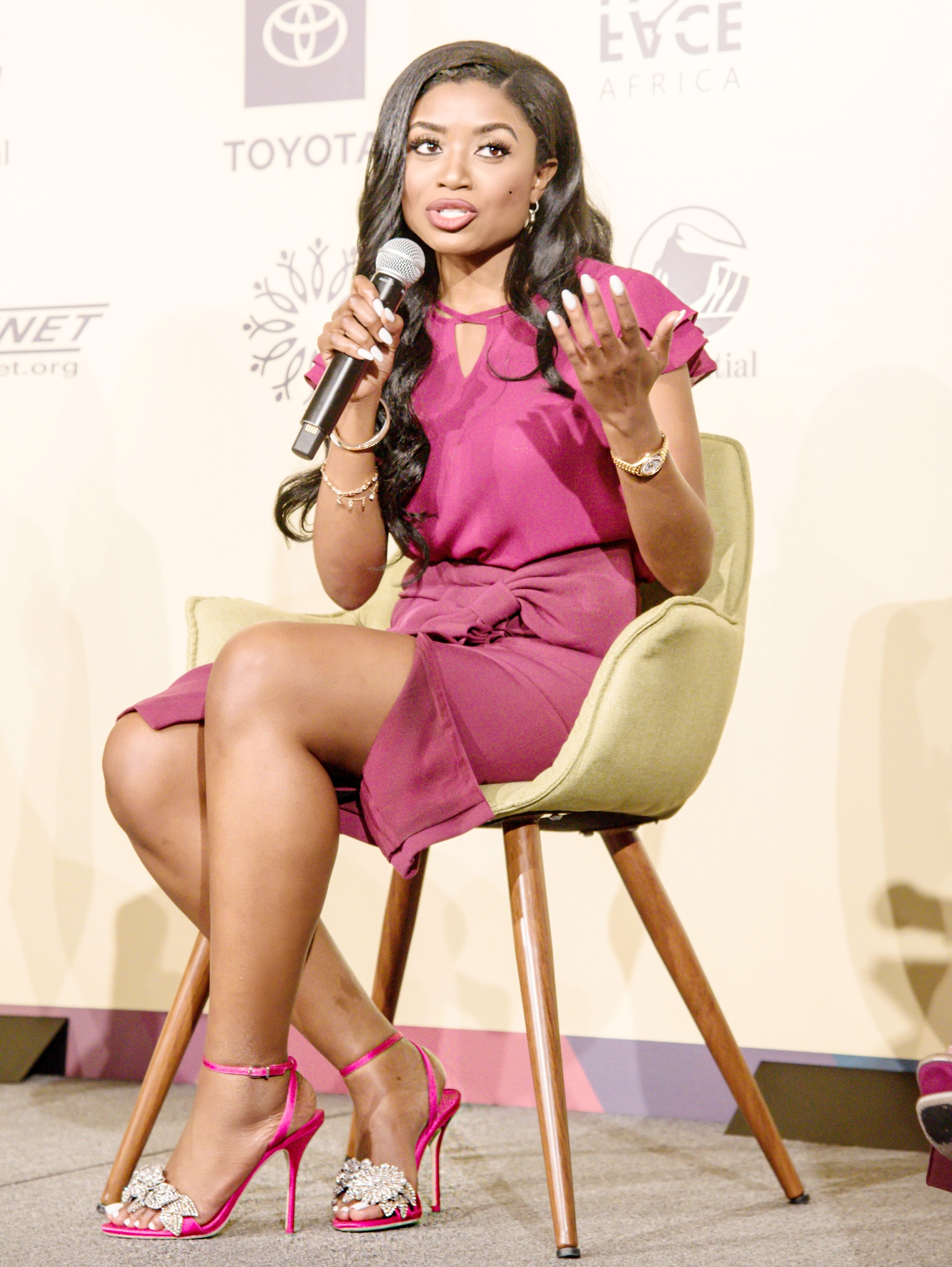
- Rexy Rolle speaking at PAWF 2018
- Born: Sherrexcia Alexis Rolle; June 19, 1988 (age 37)
- Education: Montverde Academy; University of Ottawa (BS); Lynn University (MA); Thomas Jefferson School of Law (JD)
- Occupations: President, CEO & Accountable Manager of Western Air
- Years active: 2010–present
- Parents: Rex Rolle; Shandrice Woodside-Rolle
- Musical career
- Genres: Island pop
- Instrument: Vocals
- Website: www.rexyrolle.com

Sherrexcia Alexis Rolle (born 19 June, 1988), known as Rexy Rolle, is a Bahamian attorney, airline executive and singer. She is the President, Chief Executive officer (CEO) & Accountable Manager of Western Air, a privately owned airline in The Bahamas founded by her parents.

== Early life and education ==
Rexy Rolle was born to Rex Rolle, a pilot, and Shandrice Woodside-Rolle, an entrepreneur. Rex and Shandrice serve as the President & CEO, and Vice-President & COO respectively of Western Air. Rexy is a Christian.

Rolle attended Montverde Academy in Florida. She graduated cum laude from the University of Ottawa in 2010 with a BS in Political Science & Communications, summa cum laude in 2011 with a Masters in Mass Media & Communications from Lynn University, and earned her Juris Doctor from Thomas Jefferson School of Law in 2014.

== Career ==
She is licensed to practice law in the State of California, Washington, D.C. and the Bahamas. She previously worked as a law clerk at two firms. Rolle was VP of operations and General Counsel of Western Air from 2014 to 2023, having previously worked in baggage claim. In January 2024, she was appointed President, CEO & Accountable Manager, succeeding her father. In 2018, Rolle was a speaker at the Pan-African Women Forum (PAWF) in New York City. She began the initiative Gyal on a Mission to mentor young girls to become future business leaders.

Television Appearances

- The Platform (2018)
- Anatomy of a Queen (2019)

== Music ==
In addition to her aviation career, Rolle is a professional singer.

Singles

- Here to Stay featuring Jevvo (2018)
- All Our Lives (2020)
- How You Feel (2020)
