= Western Air =

Bahamian airline

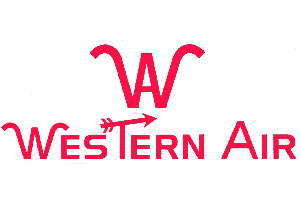

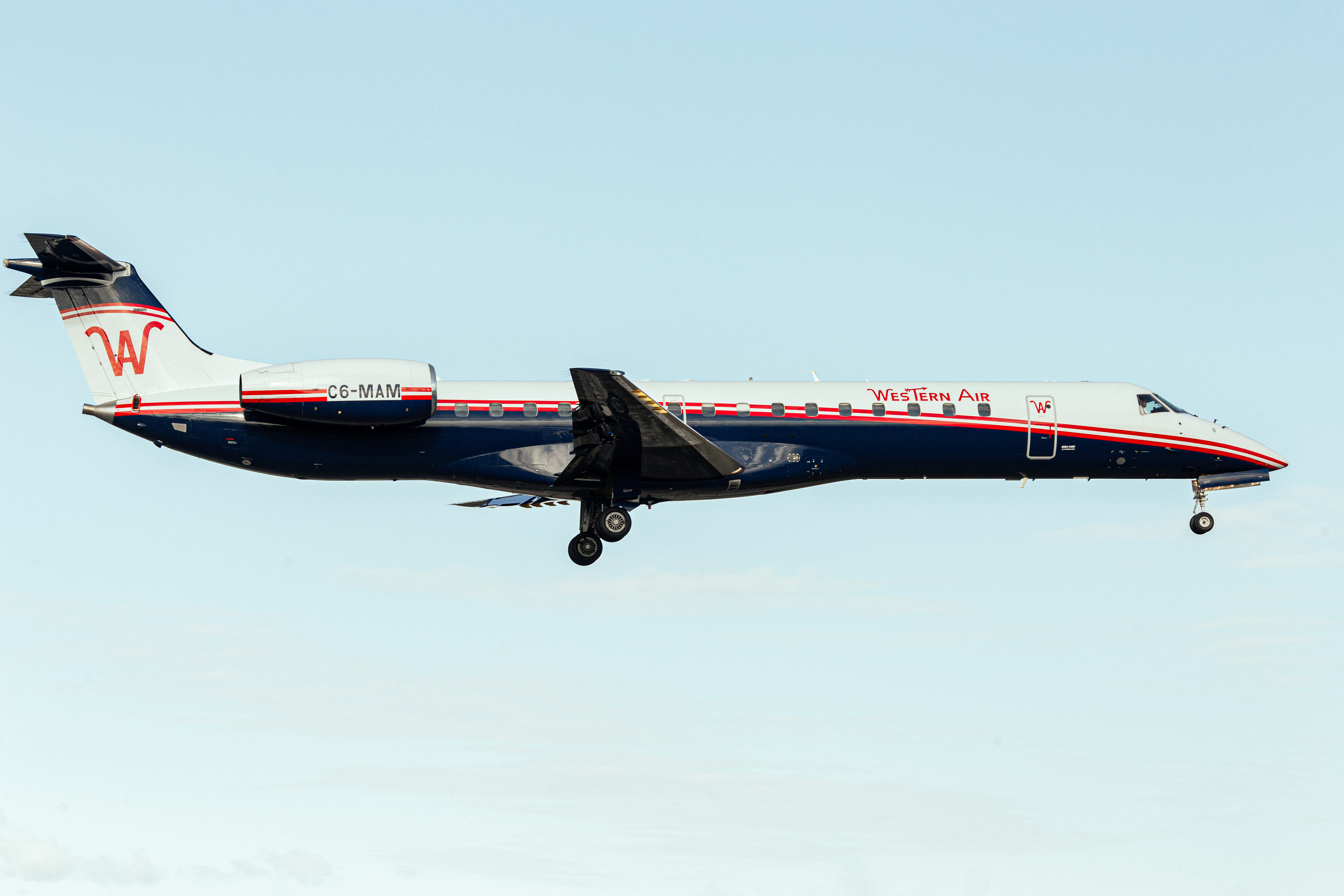
| IATA | ICAO | Call sign |
|---|---|---|
| WU | WST | WESTERN |
- Founded: 2000
- Commenced operations: 2001
- Operating bases: Grand Bahama International Airport, Grand Bahama Island
- Hubs: Grand Bahama International Airport, Lynden Pindling International Airport
- Fleet size: 8
- Destinations: 9
- Headquarters: Grand Bahama International Airport
- Key people: Rex Rolle (Chairman); Shandrice Rolle (VP, COO); Sherrexcia Rolle (President, CEO and General Counsel; formerly VP of Operations and General Counsel)
- Total equity: Est. $180 Million+ USD
- Employees: 241
- Website: westernairbahamas.com

Western Air is a commercial airline based in the Bahamas offering daily flights throughout the islands of The Bahamas and South Florida. Western Air is a privately owned airline, established in 2000, headquartered at the San Andros Airport on Andros Island. The airline operates its own passenger terminal and full service maintenance facility at the Grand Bahama International Airport. Western Air's uniformed fleet of EMB145 50-seater jets with one-class cabins are heavily utilized by Bahamian locals and tourists to travel between the city of Nassau and the outer islands, such as Bimini, Exuma, Cat Island, Andros, Abaco and Grand Bahama. Western Air launched its first US route, between Nassau and Fort Lauderdale, Florida in May 2022.

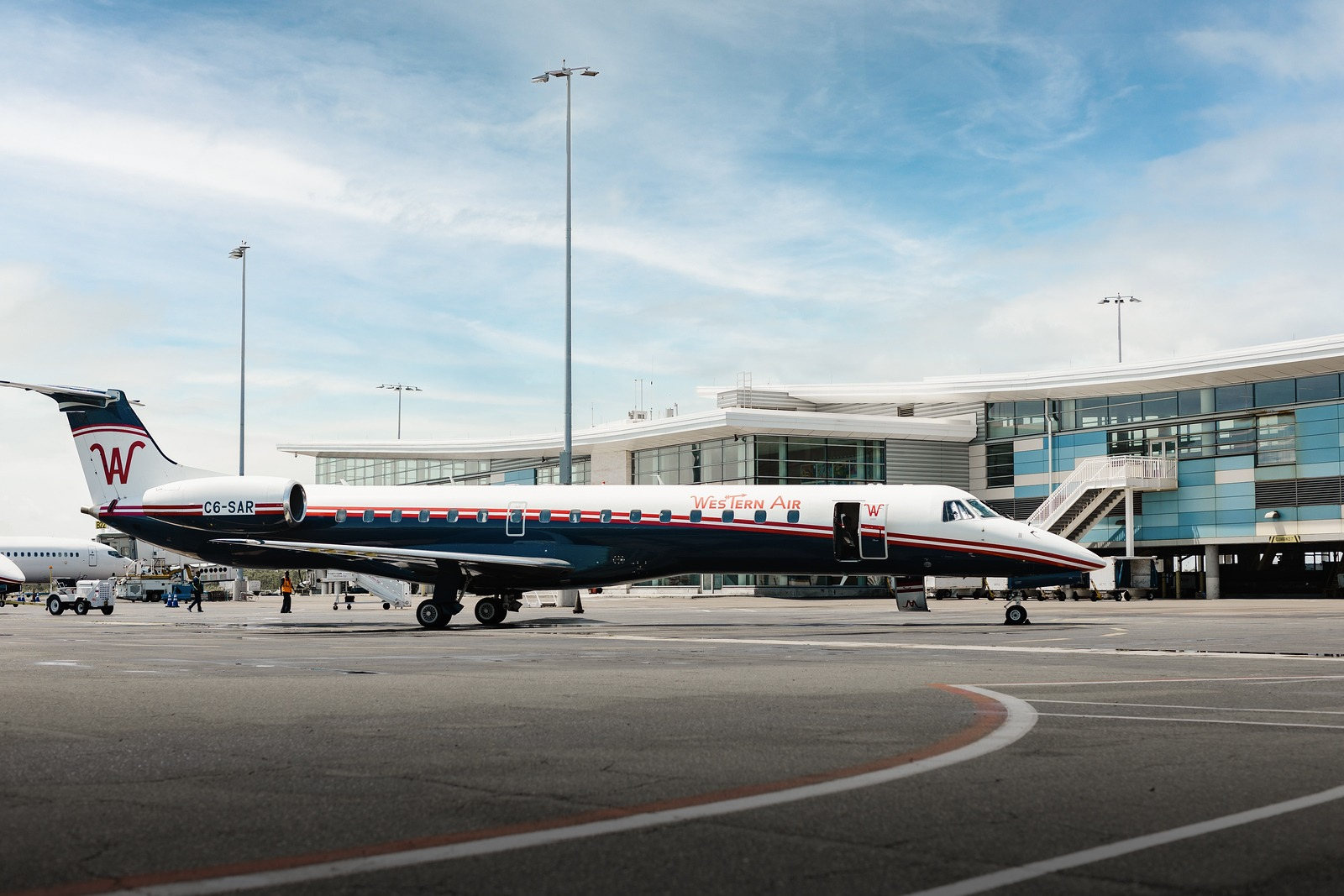
Western Air EMB145 Jet at Lynden Pindling International Airport, Nassau, Bahamas

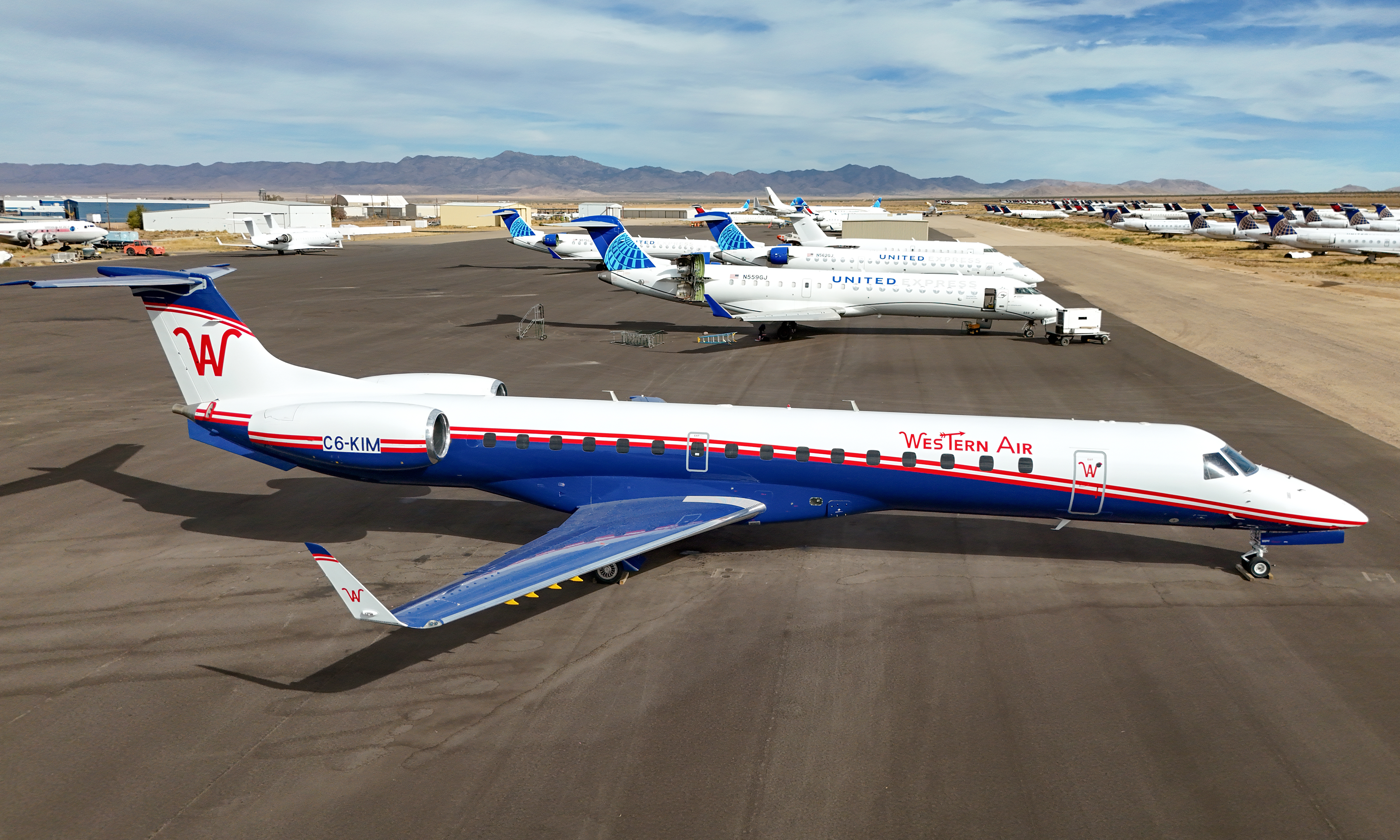
The newest fleet addition, a former United Express Embraer ERJ-145XR

== History ==
The airline was founded in 2000 by the husband-and-wife duo, Capt. Rex J. Rolle and Shandrice Woodside-Rolle by operating Fairchild Metro IIIs on one route, Nassau and San Andros. The airline's consistency and fast efficiency resulted in its service being requested by other islands. Rolle was president and CEO from the inception of the airline to 2023 and is now chairman. Woodside-Rolle is vice president and COO. Their daughter Rexy Rolle is an aviation and corporate attorney and was vice president of operations and general counsel for nine years. Rexy Rolle was named the first woman president and CEO of Western Air in January 2024.

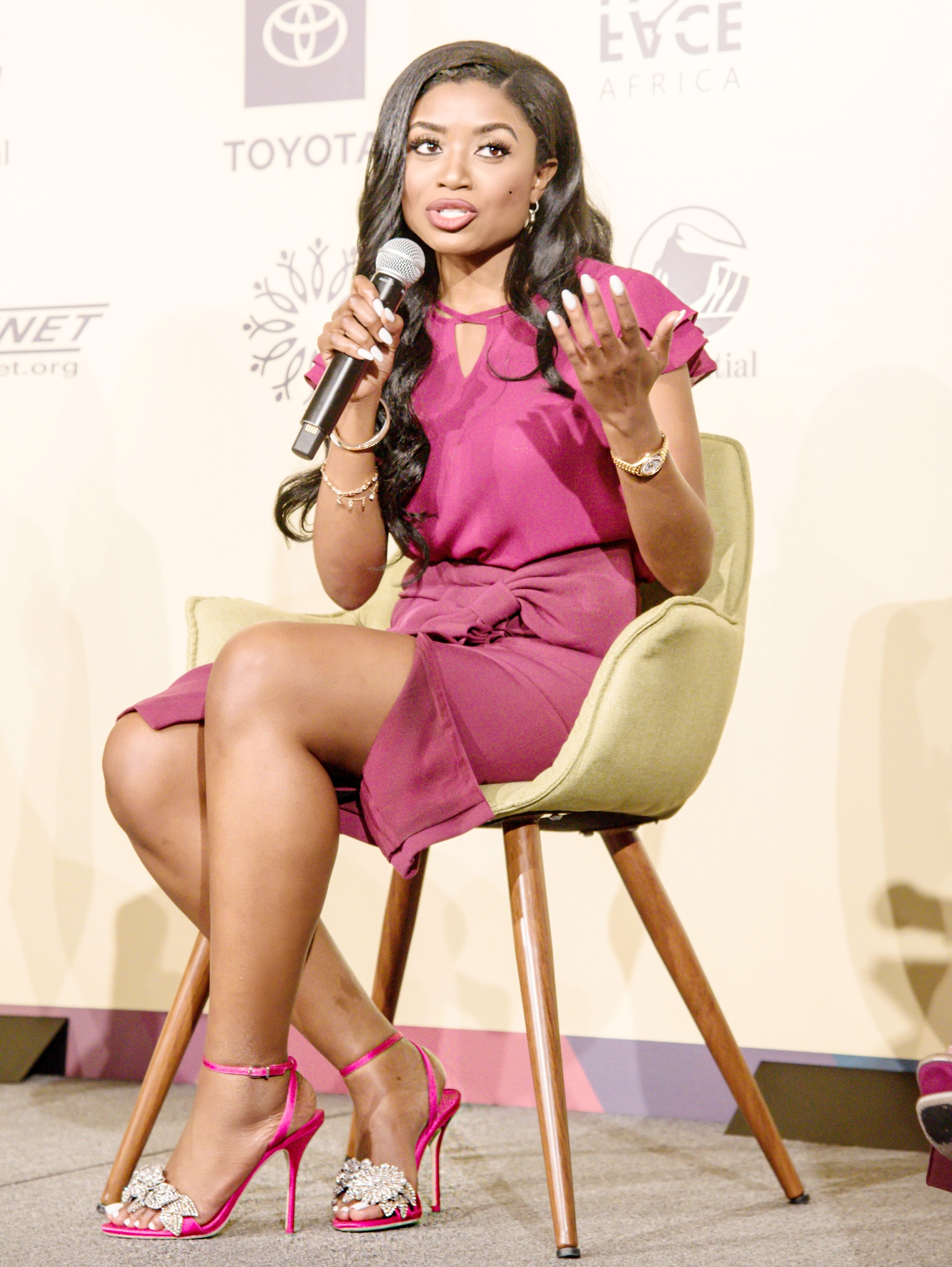
Rexy Rolle in New York City, 2018

Western Air's fleet increased with the publicized multi-aircraft deal for EMB 145s jets in 2018. The airline acquired additional jets in 2019, 2020, 2021 and 2022 to assist with growing airlift demands.

== Destinations ==
| Country | City | Airport | Hub |
|---|---|---|---|
| The Bahamas | Freeport | Grand Bahama International Airport | Yes |
| The Bahamas | Great Exuma | Exuma International Airport | No |
| The Bahamas | Marsh Harbour | Marsh Harbour Airport | No |
| The Bahamas | Nassau | Lynden Pindling International Airport | Yes |
| The Bahamas | Cat Island | New Bight Airport | No |
| The Bahamas | South Andros | Congo Town Airport | No |
| The Bahamas | Nicholls Town | San Andros Airport | No |
| The Bahamas | South Bimini | South Bimini Airport | No |
| United States | Fort Lauderdale | Fort Lauderdale–Hollywood International Airport | No |

== Hubs ==
Western Air has two major hubs inclusive of private passenger terminals, full service aircraft maintenance facilities and corporate offices located at San Andros Airport and the second hub at Grand Bahama International Airport, which serves as its northern hub.

As of September 5, 2015, Western Air unveiled its new $6 million passenger terminal and maintenance facility in Freeport, Bahamas. The Freeport passenger terminal was severely damaged by Hurricane Dorian in 2019. The passenger terminal was rebuilt and reopened in August 2023.

== Fleet ==
As of August 2025, Western Air operates the following aircraft:

Current
| Aircraft | In service | Orders | Seats |
|---|---|---|---|
| Embraer ERJ 145LR | 7 | 0 | 50 |
| Embraer ERJ 145XR | 1 | 1 | 50 |

Historic
| Aircraft | Total | Replaced by |
|---|---|---|
| Fairchild Metro III | 7 | The Saab 340 |
| Saab 340 | 14 | The E145 jets |
