= Androsia =

Bahamian textile

Androsia is a type of textile produced by the Androsia Batik Factory on Andros Island, Bahamas. It is handmade and has been manufactured on Andros since 1973 by Bahamians. This type of fabric is considered one of Andros' national treasures and won the Silver Jubilee award in 1998.

== Creation ==
Stencils are created from locally harvested sponges and fashioned into the whimsical shapes Androsia is famous for. Typically these are shapes organic in nature, for example conch shells, hibiscus flowers, and native coral heads. The stencils are dipped in heated wax and then hand pressed onto the fabric. The fabric is next soaked in dye long enough for the fabric to absorb the color. Typically Androsia is brightly colored, with hot pink and purple being two very common colors. During the dying process the wax prevents the dye from adhering to the fabric. These patches of white retain the shape of the stencils. Finally the cloth is boiled to remove the wax.

== Uses ==
Androsia is then cut into various items of batik clothing such as dresses, shirts for men and women, skirts, pareos, tank tops, t-shirts, shorts, and accessories. Androsia is also used in some furniture and in other household goods, or is sold by the yard for dressmaking, quilting, and craft projects.

== Photographs ==
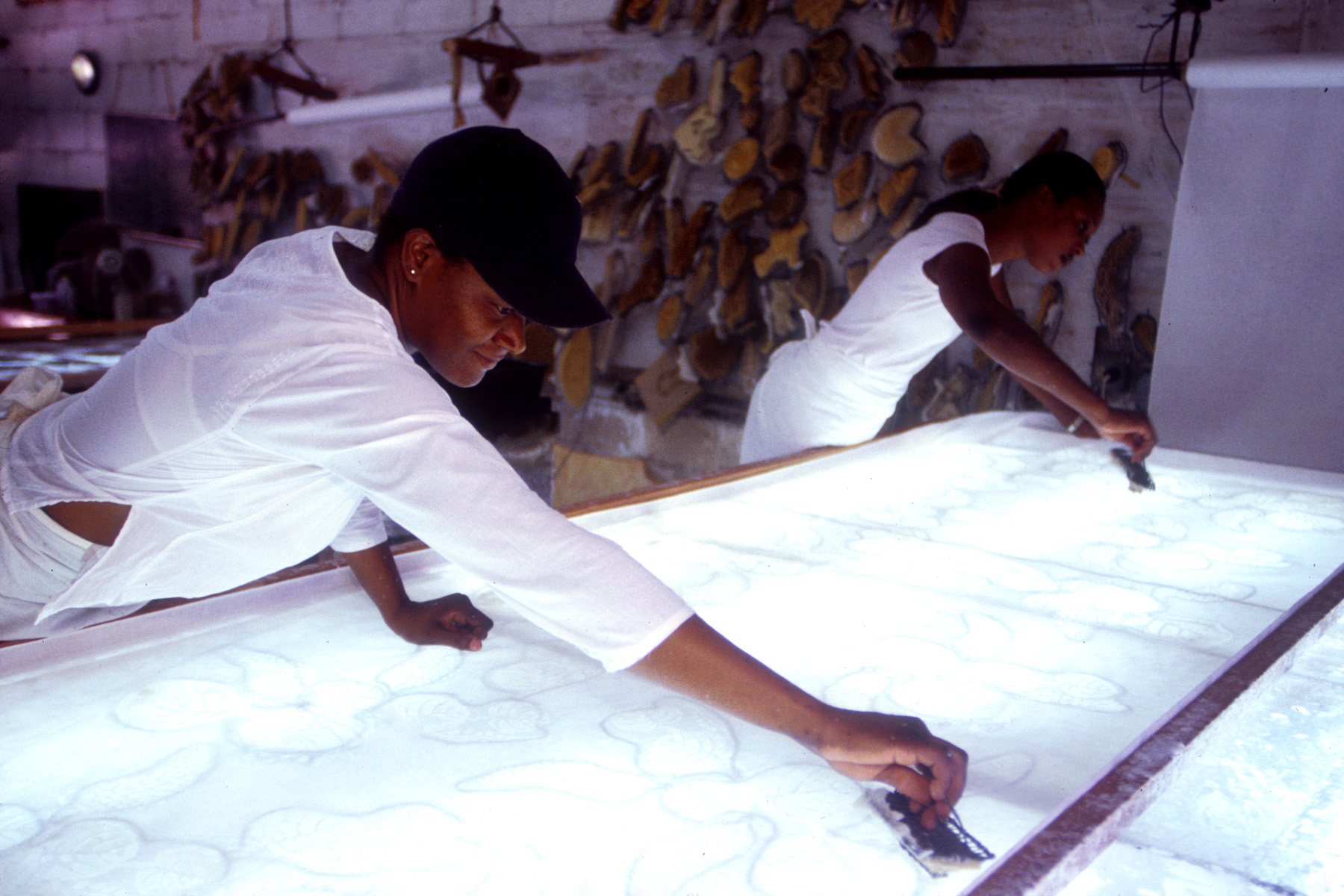
Androsia Batik Wax Room

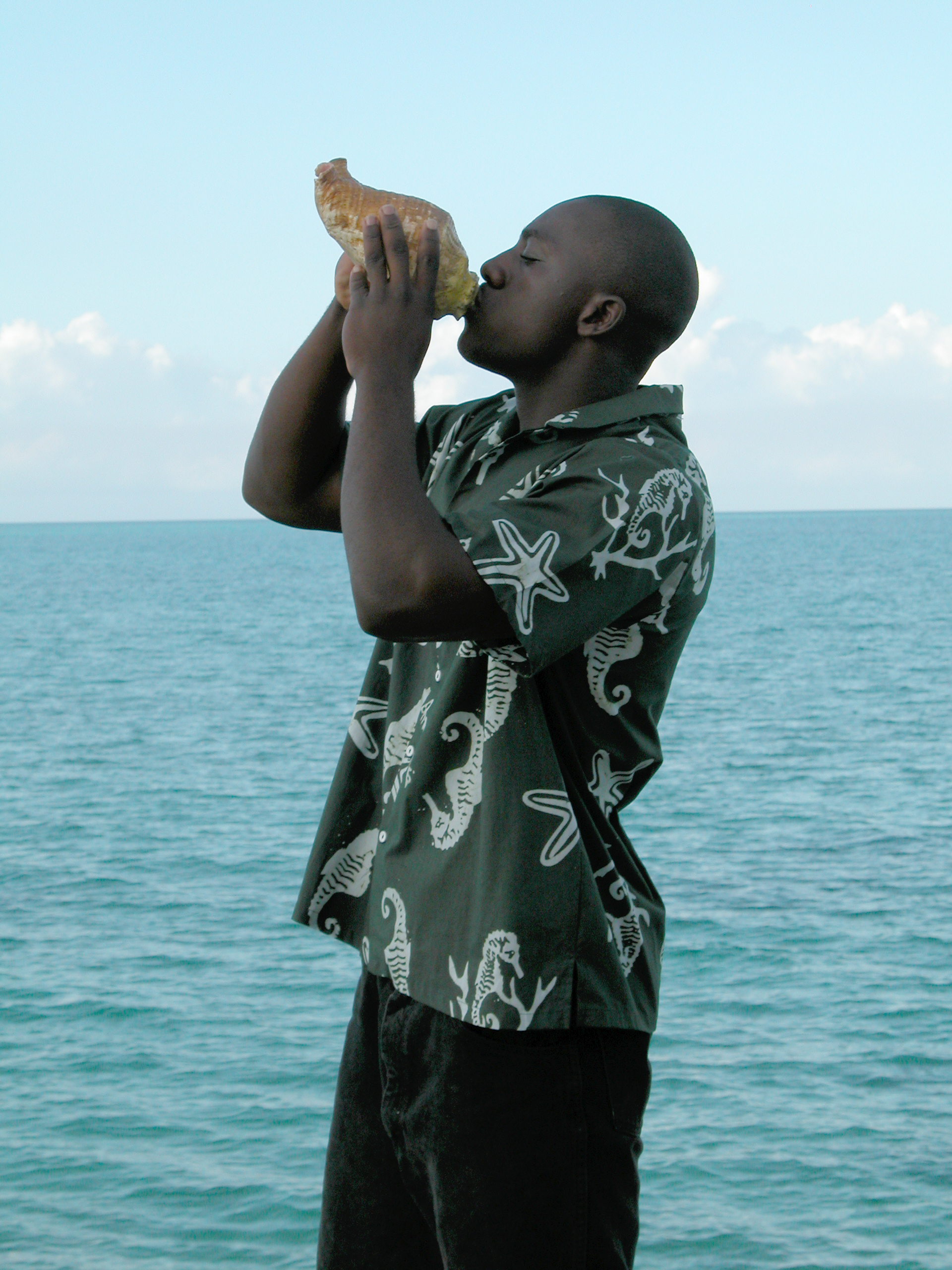
Man in olive Androsia blowing conch shell

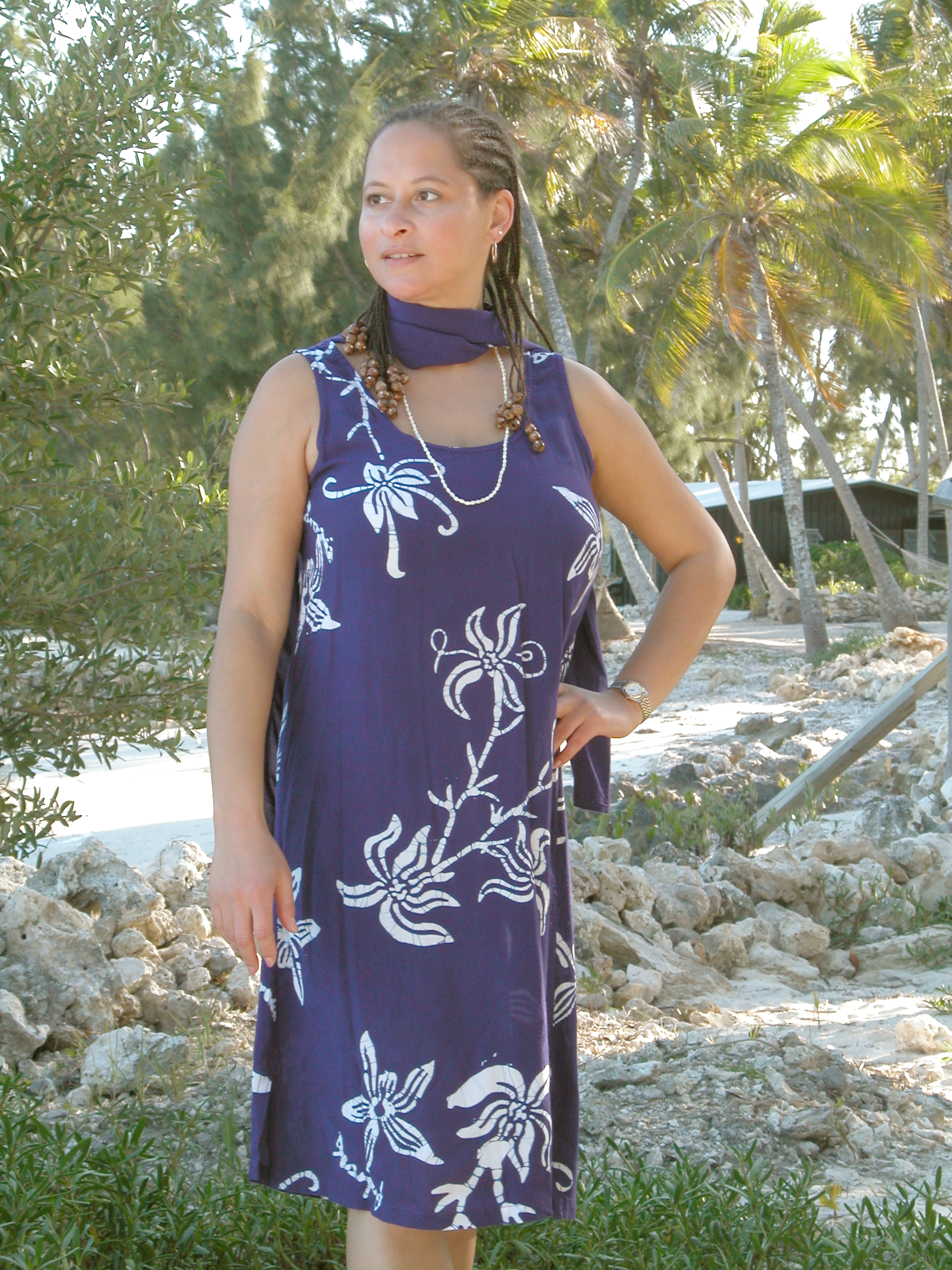
Woman in purple Androsia looking at the ocean
