= Tongue of the Ocean =

Deep oceanic trench in the Bahamas between Andros and New Providence islands

Coordinates: 24°5′25″N 77°14′6″W

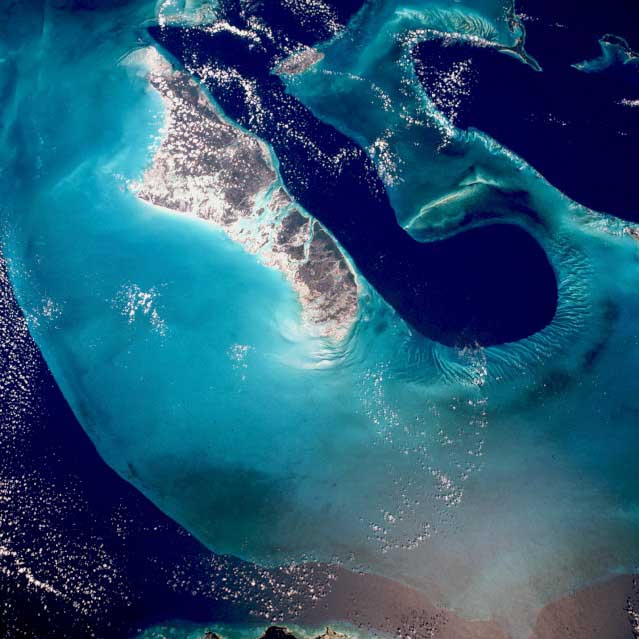
The Tongue of the Ocean can be seen along the east coast of Andros Island. The top of this picture is slightly east of north. Photo: NASA.

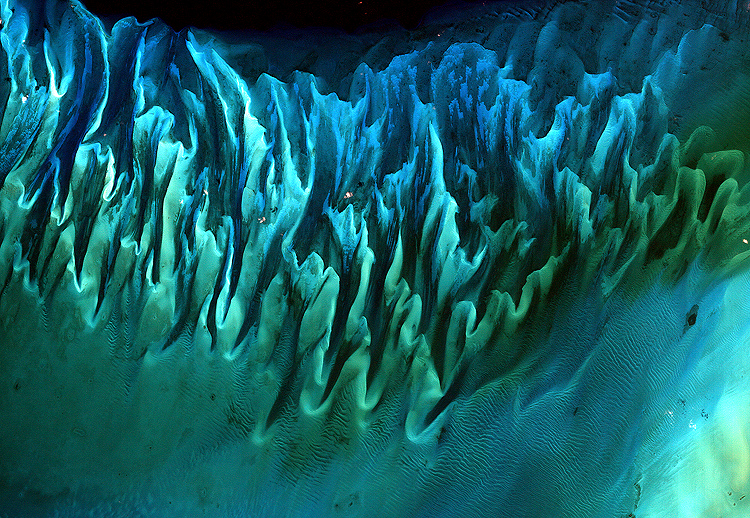
Underwater dunes, Bahamas. Tongue of the Ocean is just above this closeup. Photo: NASA

The Tongue of the Ocean (TOTO) is the name of a region of much deeper water in the Bahamas separating the islands of Andros and New Providence.

== Features ==
The TOTO is a U-shaped, relatively flat-bottomed depression measuring approximately 30 by 240 kilometres (20 by 150 mi). Its depth varies gradually from 1,100 m (3,600 ft) in the south to 2,000 m (6,600 ft) in the north.

Its only exposure to the open ocean is at the northern end. Except for the northern ocean opening, the TOTO is surrounded by numerous islands, reefs, and shoals which make a peripheral shelter isolating it from ocean disturbances, particularly high ambient noise.

This channel and the Providence Channels are the two main branches of the Great Bahama Canyon, a submerged geological feature formed by erosion during periods of lower sea level. During their early history the Tongue of the Ocean and the Providence Channel were broad, relatively shallow basins flanked by growing carbonate banks. As the Blake-Bahama platform subsided, sedimentation kept pace with subsidence on the banks, but not in the basins.

== See also ==
- Geography of the Bahamas
- Atlantic Undersea Test and Evaluation Center
- Andros Island
