= Atlantic Undersea Test and Evaluation Center =

US Navy laboratory

Atlantic Undersea Test and Evaluation Center
- Andros, Bahamas
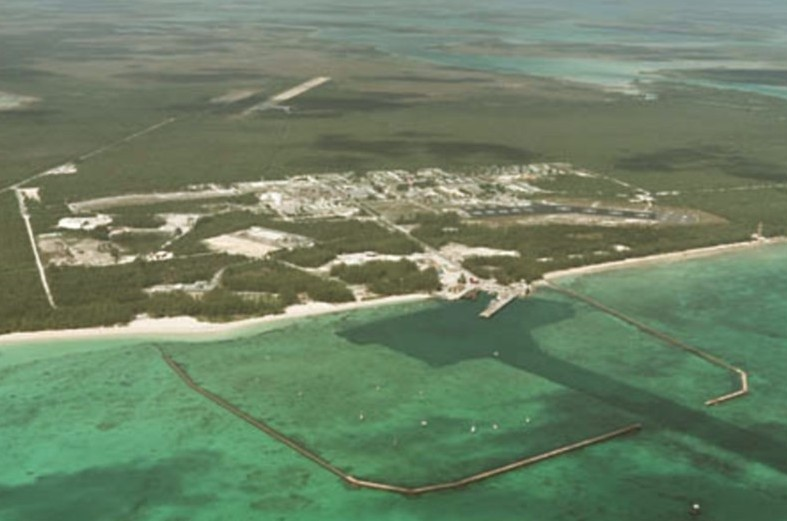
- Aerial view in 1974

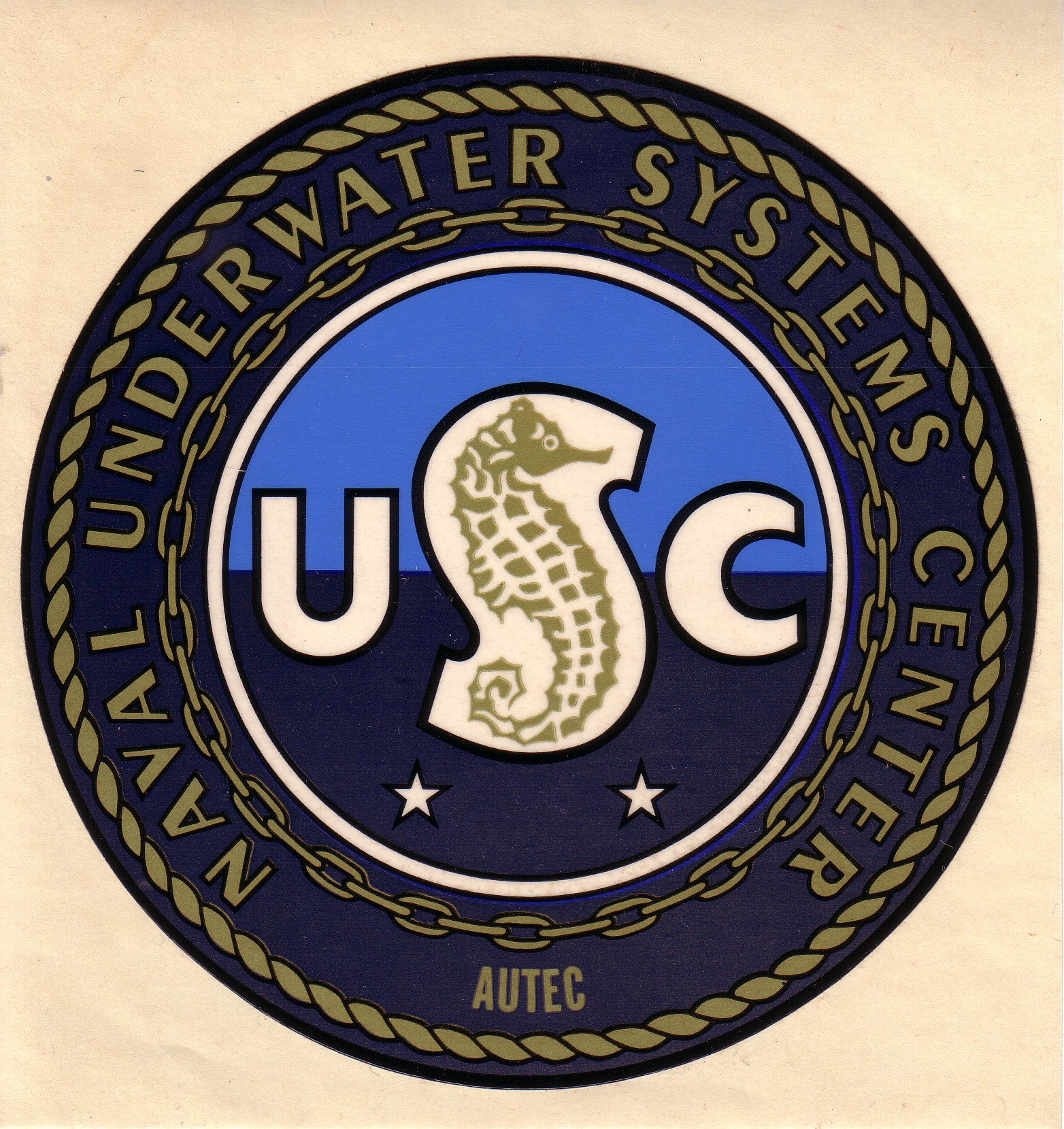
- AUTEC Insignia

Site information
- Type: Military base
- Controlled by: United States Navy

Location
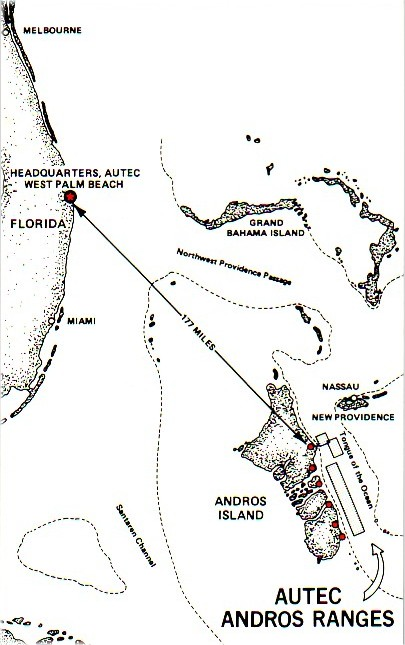
- Coordinates: 24°42′20″N 77°46′9″W

Site history
- In use: 1966–present

The United States Navy's Atlantic Undersea Test and Evaluation Center (AUTEC) is a laboratory that performs integrated three-dimensional hydrospace/aerospace trajectory measurements covering the entire spectrum of undersea simulated warfare – calibration, classifications, detection, and destruction. Its mission is to assist in establishing and maintaining naval ability of the United States through testing, evaluation, and underwater research.

== Background ==
The typical task performed at AUTEC is testing and certifying the proficiency of U.S. Navy submarine captains and their crews, as well as the accuracy of their undersea weapons. The sophisticated facility includes three test ranges – the Weapons Range, the Acoustic Range, and the FORACS Range – all located in the Tongue of the ocean (TOTO), a deep-ocean basin approximately 100 nautical miles (190 km) long by 15 nautical miles (28 km) wide, with depths as great as 6,000 feet (1,800 m). The main AUTEC support base and downrange tracking stations are on Andros Island in the Bahamas, just west of Nassau and about 180 nautical miles (333 km) southeast of West Palm Beach, Florida. On January 23, 2020, the corporation PAE Applied Technologies received roughly $32.9 million for six more months of facility and range maintenance and range operations support services at AUTEC. On August 12, 2020, the corporation Amentum (created in January 2020 when AECOM sold its management services business to American Securities LLC and affiliates of the private equity firm Lindsay Goldberg) received roughly $430 million for five years' worth of operation and maintenance of AUTEC.

== History ==
During the 1940s and 1950s, the U.S. Navy's need for a deep water test facility became so apparent that in 1958 the Chief of Naval Operations established an advisory group to determine the location and specifications for testing underwater vehicles, weapons, and weapon systems. As a result of the extensive studies of this group, the United States Secretary of the Navy in November 1959 directed establishment of the Atlantic Undersea Test and Evaluation Center (AUTEC) under the Bureau of Ships (now Naval Sea Systems Command) to provide a deep water test and evaluation facility for making underwater acoustic measurement, testing sonar, and providing accurate underwater, surface and air tracking data on ships and weapons in support of the U.S. Navy's antisubmarine and undersea research and development programs.

The area chosen for AUTEC was the Tongue of the Ocean (TOTO) located between the islands of Andros, New Providence, and Exuma Sound in the Bahamas. Chosen because of its ideal natural characteristics, and its climate which permits year-round operations, the TOTO is a U-shaped, relatively flat-bottomed trench approximately 20 miles (32 km) wide by 150 miles (240 km) long with a depth which varies gradually from 3,600 feet (1,100 m) in the south to 6,600 feet (2,000 m) in the north. Its only exposure to the open ocean is at the northern end, and except for this ocean opening, the TOTO is surrounded by numerous islands, reefs, and shoals which make a peripheral shelter isolating it from ocean disturbances, particularly high ambient noise which degrades undersea tests and evaluations.

A joint United States/United Kingdom Agreement signed in 1963 with the concurrence of the Bahamian Government, enabled the United States to develop this area of water and certain territory on the east coast of Andros Island, readily accessible to the TOTO, and there install equipment to build three offshore test ranges. Under this agreement, the Royal Navy has equal access to the test facility.

Construction of the Navy's Main Base and the downrange tracking sites on Andros Island began in March 1964, and the initial cadre of officers and men arrived by U.S. Navy LST in August 1965. In October of that year, Commander G. P Barney arrived as the first permanent Officer-in-charge, Andros Ranges, and the official dedication of AUTEC was held on 14 April 1966. The complex electronics installation was accomplished from fall of 1965 to fall of 1966, and in September 1966 RCA Service Company was awarded the Maintenance and Operations Contract for AUTEC.

Temporary U.S. Mainland Headquarters was opened at the Orlando Air Force Base in September 1966 with Captain L. L. Jackson, Jr., being assigned as prospective commanding officer. Following a study of possible locations for a permanent headquarters the West Palm Beach, Florida area was chosen due to the combined facilities of the airport and the Port of Palm Beach, plus its proximity to Andros Island.

On 26 February 1967, AUTEC was commissioned at West Palm Beach when Admiral E. J. Fahy, Commander, Naval Ship Systems Command, presented Captain Jackson with orders making him the first Commanding Officer, and AUTEC became an operational field activity. In May 1967, headquarters personnel moved from Orlando to West Palm Beach and established offices at the Palm Beach International Airport in the building which was formerly the Airport Terminal. In July 1967 at a Change of Command ceremony on Andros Island, Commander Barney was relieved by the new Officer-in-Charge, Andros Ranges, Commander Frank A. Smith.

First of the three ranges to become operational was the Weapons Range in 1966. This was followed by the Acoustics Range, a portion of which became operational in 1968 with a total operational capability anticipated by the end of 1969. First phase of the Sonar Range became operational in January 1968, and the final phases, were scheduled to be completed and operational by 1974.

== Deep water range ==
The deep water Weapons Range lies roughly parallel to the east coast of Andros Island. It is the largest and most versatile of the AUTEC ranges, and it is capable of tracking up to 63 in-water objects simultaneously. The range is supported by the Main Base (Site 1) and various smaller sites located to the south along the east coast of Andros Island. AN/WQC-2A Sonar Communications Sets and Bi-Directional Communications Nodes provide underwater voice communications for mobile target and emergency command signal coverage, while HF, UHF, and VHF radio communications are available over the entire range.

== In-air tracking ==
In-air tracking is provided by radars and various other in-air tracking systems such as LATR, the Hyperbolic In-Air Tracking System (HITS), and Differential GPS (DGPS). These in-air systems cover the AUTEC Weapons Range up to a distance of 500 nautical miles (930 km) from Site 1 and a height of 70,000 feet (21,000 m). Surveillance radars operate to support air and surface safety.

== In-water tracking ==
The in-water portion of the Weapons Range covers 500 square nautical miles (1,700 km²). This range can be divided into two distinct tracking areas consisting of roughly 250 square nautical miles (850 km²). This flexibility allows for the unique operation of two distinct individual exercises. Use of the total range is referred to as "Weapons Range", while dividing the range into two distinct portions, the northern section is referred to as "Weapons Range North", whereas the southern portion is called "Weapons Range South".

== Electronic Warfare Threat Simulator ==
Electronic Warfare Threat Simulator (EWTS) is a real-time system that can generate complex, dynamic, electromagnetic signal environments at the radio frequency (RF) level. With this system, AUTEC offers capabilities to test different platform receivers in an open-air, over-the-water range. The system consists of a radar simulator, pedestal and controller, antennas, high-power amplifiers, calibration equipment, and an operator workstation. The system is housed in an air-conditioned radome and located on a 74-foot (23 m) tower.

== Namesakes ==
Major facilities at AUTEC's Andros Island base were named in 1969 in honor of various Navy heroes:

- Shafer Brothers Hall, the 116-man Bachelor Enlisted Quarters (BEQ), was named in honor of Benjamin N. and John D. Shafer, who were Chief Electrician's Mates aboard the USS Thresher when she was lost in 1963.
- Jacobson Hall, the 250-man BEQ was named in honor of George W. Jacobson, Sr., Chief Motor Machinist's Mate who died in 1966. During World War II he served aboard the USS Pillsbury and received the Silver Star Medal for his valiant service during the capture of a German submarine off French West Africa in June 1944.
- Mackey Hall, the BEQ Mess, was named in honor of Harry E. Mackey, Jr., an Aviation Machinist's Mate killed in action in November 1943. He was posthumously awarded the Distinguished Flying Cross for heroism and extraordinary achievement during operations off French Morocco.
- Momsen Hall, the 75-man Bachelor Officer Quarters (BOQ), was named in honor of Vice Admiral Charles B. Momsen who died in May 1967. He was awarded the Distinguished Service Medal for developing the Momsen Lung.
- Danenhower Hall, the BOQ Mess, was named in honor of Lt. Commander Sloan Danenhower who died in November 1967. He was a pioneer submariner who commanded the original USS Nautilus on an Arctic expedition in 1931. He was the son of John Wilson Danenhower, commander of the USS Jeannette.
- Roger L. Glei Chapel was named after Roger L. Glei who, in 1969 during the Vietnam War, left his protected armored position during heavy gunfire to aid an injured vehicle machinegunner and consequently sacrificed his own life. Previous to joining the U.S. Army, Roger's parents, Alfred and Ruth Glei, brought him to AUTEC in October 1966.

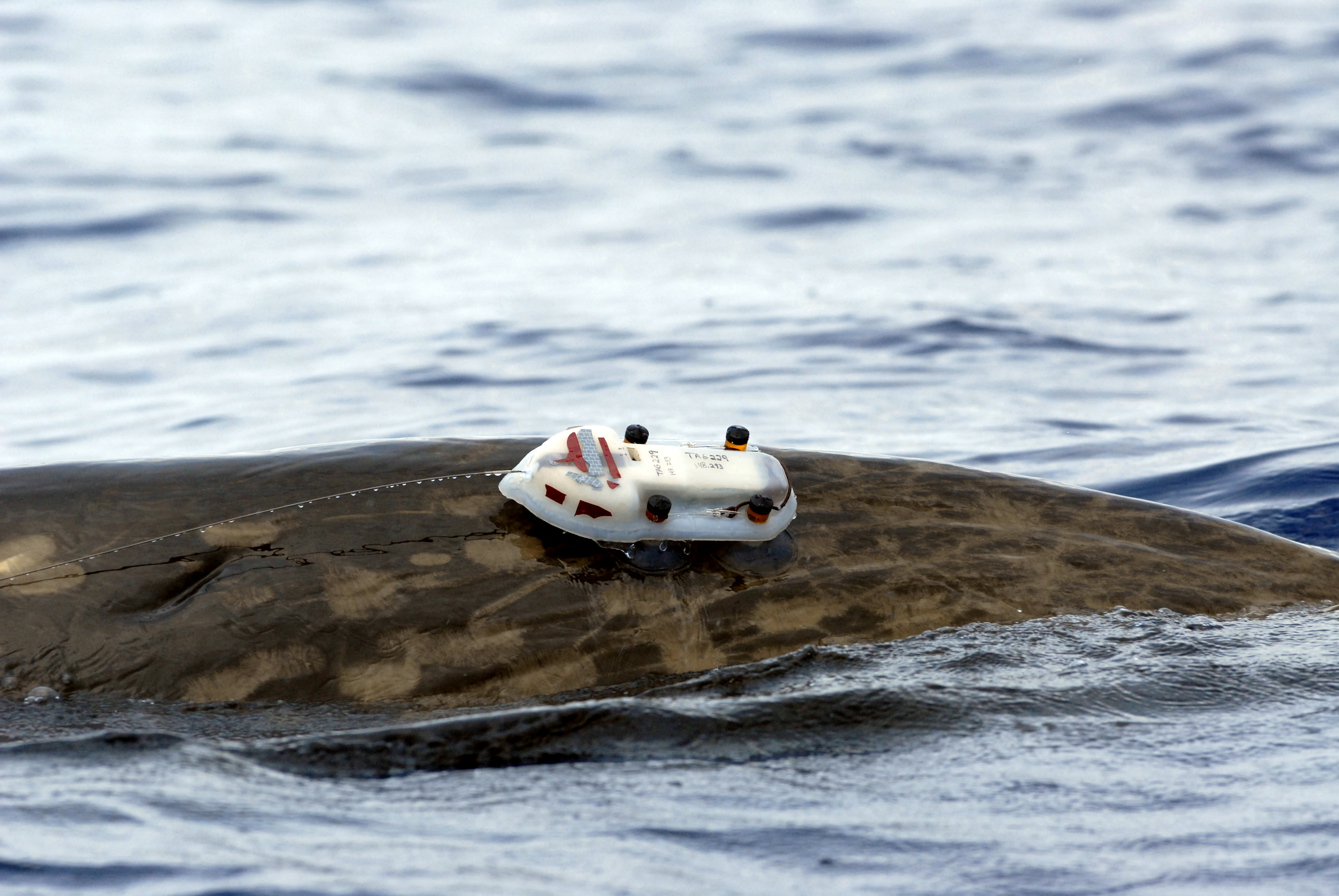
Male dense-beaked whale tagged for study

== In popular culture ==
- In Tom Clancy's 1988 novel The Cardinal of the Kremlin (sequel to The Hunt for Red October), the former Soviet submarine captain Marko Ramius (portrayed by Sean Connery in The Hunt for Red October movie) works for AUTEC as Mark Ramsey after his defection to the United States.
- In NCIS Season 9 episode "The Tell", The plot of the episode revolves around AUTEC.

== Other research ==
AUTEC also performs some biological research in the surrounding ocean environments.

== See also ==
- BUTEC
- Naval Undersea Warfare Center
