= South Andros Airport =

South Andros Airport Congo Town Airport
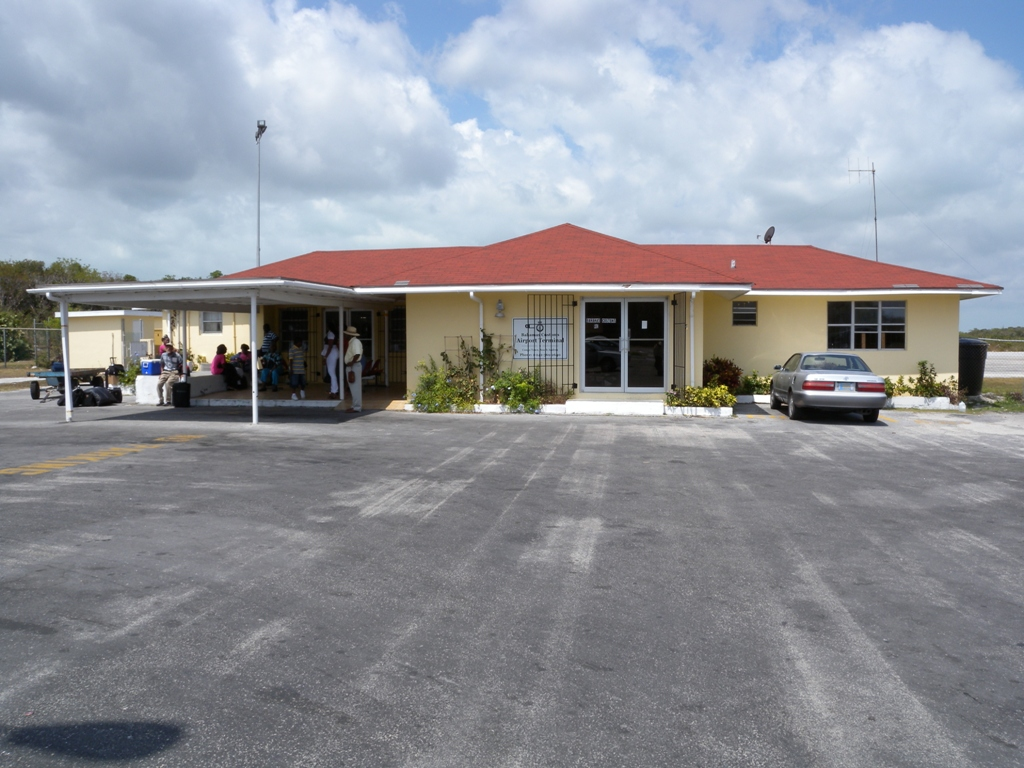
- IATA: TZN; ICAO: MYAK

Summary
- Airport type: Public
- Operator: Government
- Serves: Congo Town, Andros Island, Bahamas
- Elevation AMSL: 15 ft / 5 m
- Coordinates: 24°09′32″N 077°35′23″W

Map
- Location in The Bahamas

Runways
Direction	Length		Surface
Direction	m	ft	Surface
10/28	1,623	5,325	Asphalt
- Source: WAD, GCM

South Andros Airport (IATA: TZN, ICAO: MYAK) is an airport near Congo Town. In South Andros, part of Andros Island is in The Bahamas. It is also known as Congo Town Airport (IATA: ~~COX~~).

== Facilities ==
The airport resides at an elevation of 15 ft (4.6 m) above mean sea level. It has one runway designated 10/28 with an asphalt surface measuring 1,623 m × 30 m (5,325 ft × 98 ft).

== Airlines and destinations ==
Airlines	Destinations
Western Air	Nassau
