= Andros, The Bahamas =

Archipelago of The Bahamas

Andros
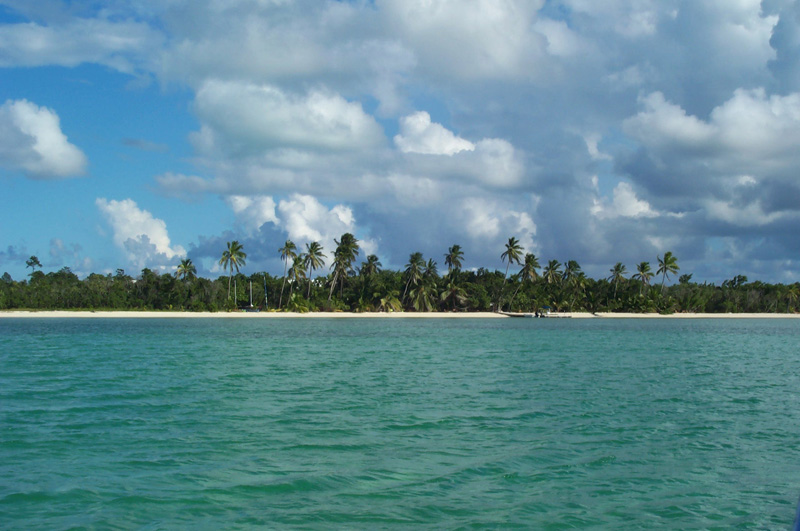
- Beach on South Andros Island

- Location within Bahamas

Geography
- Location: Atlantic Ocean
- Coordinates: 24°27′N 77°54′W
- Archipelago: The Bahamas
- Major islands: North Andros, Mangrove Cay, South Andros
- Area: 5,957 km^{2} (2,300 sq mi)
- Length: 167 km (103.8 mi)
- Width: 64 km (39.8 mi)

Administration
- The Bahamas
- Largest settlement: Andros Town (pop. 2,318)

Demographics
- Population: 7,695 (2022)
- Pop. density: 1.29/km^{2} (3.34/sq mi)
- Ethnic groups: Blacks 85%, Whites 12%, Asian 3%

Andros is an archipelago in The Bahamas. Politically considered a single island, Andros in total has an area greater than all the other 700 Bahamian islands combined. The land area of Andros consists of hundreds of small islets and cays connected by mangrove estuaries and tidal swamplands, together with three major islands: North Andros, Mangrove Cay, and South Andros. The three main islands are separated by bights, estuaries that divide the island from east to west. Andros is 167 kilometres (104 mi) long by 64 km (40 mi) wide at the widest point. It is about 50 kilometres (31 mi) west of the capital city Nassau in New Providence, separated by the deep channel known as the Tongue of the Ocean. As of 2022, Andros has a population of approximately 8,000 people.

The Andros Barrier Reef, the sixth-longest coral reef in the world, runs along the eastern side of the island for about 225 km (140 mi), averaging a distance of 2–3 km (1–2 mi) from the shore. The island has the world's largest collection of blue holes, water-filled entrances to underwater cave systems. The Great Bahama Bank is off of the island's west coast.

The Lucayan people were the indigenous inhabitants of Andros. In the early 1500s, Spanish colonizers enslaved the Lucayans and moved them to other islands, leaving Andros mostly uninhabited for about 130 years. After a long British colonial era, which started around the mid-1600s, the Bahamas became an independent country in 1973. The population of Andros has included Loyalists who left the United States after the American Revolution and brought their slaves with them, Black Seminoles and escaped slaves who fled Florida in the 1800s, Africans freed from slave ships, other settlers and immigrants, and descendants. Traditional culture in parts of Andros reflects West African and Seminole influence.

Major employers on Andros include the Bahamian government, the U.S. Navy Atlantic Undersea Test and Evaluation Center, commercial fishing, and tourism. Tourism is the largest industry and includes scuba diving and recreational fishing, especially bonefishing.

== Etymology ==
The indigenous Lucayan people called the island Habacoa (or Babucca) meaning "large upper outer land". Originally named Espiritu Santu by the Spanish, Andros Island was given its present name sometime early during the period of British colonial rule. Several eighteenth-century British documents refer to it as Andrews Island. A 1782 map refers to the island as San Andreas.

The modern name is believed to be in honour of Sir Edmund Andros, Commander of His Majesty's Forces in Barbados in 1672 and governor successively of New York, Massachusetts, and New England. Andros was notable for his role in the collapse of the Dominion of New England, after which he was removed from office and jailed by disgruntled colonists who took advantage of the ambiguous status of royal governors after King James II who had appointed them was deposed by William and Mary in the Glorious Revolution in England.

Secondary and tertiary sources indicate that the island may have been named after the inhabitants of St Andro Island (also called St Andrew or San Andrés) off the Mosquito Coast of Honduras, because 1,400 migrants reportedly settled in Andros in 1787. Contemporary records, including official Bahamian census figures from 1788 and 1807, indicate that the number of inhabitants of Andros in that period was fewer than 400, and the original source of this report remains obscure. Only 2,650 individuals were evacuated from the Mosquito Coast in 1787, including individuals evacuated from St. Andrews Island, and 2,214 are known to have settled in Belize. The misconception appears to stem from a misreading of the Royal Geographical Society account of the transfer of the inhabitants from St. Andrews to Andros. The 1879 report states that the descendants of the migrants living in northern Andros numbered 1,400 as of 1879, as opposed to their ancestors comprising that number in 1787 when the original migration took place.

Another theory suggests that the island was named after the Greek isle of Andros, by Greek sponge fishermen.

The theory that the island was named for Sir Edmund Andros is the most widely accepted.

== History ==
=== Pre-Columbian and Spanish eras ===
The Lucayans, a subgroup of the Taíno people, were Indigenous to The Bahamas at the time of European encounter. Archeological artefacts and remains have been found in both Morgan's Cave on North Andros, and in the Stargate Blue Hole on South Andros. The population of The Bahamas is estimated to have been approximately 40,000 Lucayan-Taínos when the Spanish arrived in the region.

Spain claimed the Bahamas after Columbus' arrival on the islands—his first landfall in the Western Hemisphere may have been on the Bahamian island of San Salvador. The Italian explorer Amerigo Vespucci, for whom the Americas are named, came on a Spanish charter and spent four months exploring The Bahamas in 1499–1500. He mapped a portion of the eastern shore of Andros Island.

Spanish exploitation of the labour of the natives of nearby Hispaniola rapidly reduced the population of that island, leading the Governor of Hispaniola to complain to the Spanish crown. After Columbus's death, Ferdinand II of Aragon ordered in 1509 that Indians be imported from nearby islands to make up the population losses in Hispaniola, and the Spanish began capturing Lucayans in the Bahamas for use as chattel labour in Hispaniola; within two years the southern Bahamas were largely depopulated. The Spanish may have carried away as many as 40,000 Lucayans by 1513. A 1520 expedition by the Spanish discovered only 11 people in The Bahamas; the Lucayans were effectively eradicated from these islands. The islands of the Bahamas, including Andros Island, remained uninhabited thereafter for approximately 130 years.

The Bahamas subsequently passed back and forth between Spanish and British rule for 150 years. Britain gained control following the American Revolutionary War by treaty in 1783, when it exchanged East Florida with Spain for The Bahamas.

=== British colonial era 1648–1973 ===
In 1648 English settlers from Bermuda established a colony on Eleuthera. In 1666 the English founded Charles Town—later renamed Nassau—on New Providence.

During the late 1600s and 1700s, various pirates and buccaneers frequented Andros Island. In 1713 the Bahama Islands were declared a Republic of Pirates. Morgan's Bluff and Morgan's Cave on North Andros are named after the famous privateer-pirate, Henry Morgan, for whom Captain Morgan's Spiced Rum is named. It is said that the Andros settlement of Small Hope Bay was so named because Morgan claimed there would be "small hope" of anybody finding the treasure he had hidden there. Pirates raiding the Spanish treasure galleons out of Cuba maintained a settlement on South Andros.

Loyalists fleeing the United States during and after the American Revolution settled on various Bahama Islands including Andros, bringing their slaves with them. In addition, Andros was the destination of many families who were squeezed out of the Belize logwood industry following the relocation of Mosquito Coast settlers to British Honduras in 1787. By 1788 the population of all The Bahamas was reported as 3,000 whites and 8,000 blacks. The 1788 census for Andros reported 22 white heads of families, with a total of 132 slaves; they cultivated 329 hectares (813 acres) of land.

After the United States acquired Florida from Spain in 1821, some Seminoles and black American slaves escaped and sailed to the west coast of Andros by the wrecking sloop Steerwater, where they established the settlement of Red Bays. Hundreds of Black Seminoles and slaves travelling in 1823 by canoe and 27 sloops across the Gulf Stream joined them, with more arriving in later years. While sometimes called "Black Indians", the descendants of Black Seminoles identify as Bahamians, while acknowledging their connections to the American South.

In 1807, the British Empire had banned the international slave trade in its colonies through the Slave Trade Act. At times U.S. ships in its domestic coastwise slave trade were wrecked on Bahama islands or reefs. Even before 1834, when Britain abolished slavery in its colonies, the colonial governments in the Caribbean freed the slaves from such American ships as the Comet and Encomium, and later the Hermosa.

In addition, Bahamian mariners raided passing illegal slave ships and liberated Africans. Such freed Africans entered a system of apprenticeship or indentured servitude in The Bahamas. Later, many of these freed Africans and their offspring migrated to the Out Islands, including Andros, resulting in an indigenous culture that is closer to those in West Africa than most other black cultures in the Western Hemisphere.

In the 19th and early 20th centuries (1841–1938), Greek spongers immigrated to Andros for the rich sponge fishing on the Great Bahama Bank off Andros' west coast. For a period of years, Andros sponging was The Bahamas' largest industry. In the 1930s, the sponges were wiped out by a Red Tide infestation. The sponging industry died, and the spongers left the island for Key West, and Tarpon Springs, Florida. Thousands of unemployed Bahamians moved to the village of Coconut Grove near Miami.

From the 1950s through the 1970s, the Owens Lumber company, a US-owned company, deforested much of the indigenous pineyards that grew on North Andros. As a result of poor planning for sustainable harvests, the island today has overcrowded forests of mainly young trees.

In the 1960s and 1970s The Bahamas, led by Sir Lynden Pindling, the Member of Parliament for Kemps Bay on South Andros, negotiated independence from the British. Self-rule was granted in 1964, and one-man one-vote Majority Rule in 1967.

The Bahamas achieved Independence 10 July 1973. One of the final acts of the British Crown in The Bahamas was to grant AUTEC a long-term lease for land on Andros. (It is similar to the U.S. lease for its Guantanamo Bay Navy Base in Cuba.)

Sir Lynden became the first Prime Minister of The Bahamas. He served until 1992, when his party lost control of Parliament. He retained his seat representing South Andros.

=== Timeline ===
- 800–1500± Gradual population of the Bahamas, including Andros Island, by the Lucayan people
- 1520± The Spanish find the Lucayan people are eradicated following decades of exploitation as regional slave labourers
- 1650–1750± Pirate Era
- 1725 British naturalist Mark Catesby visits Andros
- 1783 British Loyalist settlers arrive from the United States
- 1807–1865 Africans freed from slave ships after passage of Great Britain's Slave Trade Act settle on Andros
- 1821–1840 Black Seminoles and slaves emigrate from Florida
- 1841 Commercial sponging era begins in the flats of west Andros
- 1892 Andros Fibre (sisal plantation) founded
- 1938 Red tide wipes out sponge industry
- 1950–1975 Deforestation of North Andros pineyards
- 1960 Small Hope Bay Lodge, Bahamas' first dive resort, opens near Fresh Creek
- 1961 First American in space Alan Shepard reports he can see Andros Island from space
- 1964 Construction of AUTEC Base begins
- 1965 U.S. submersible DSV Alvin begins work off Andros
- 1968 Bridges built across Fresh Creek and Stafford Creek, unifying North Andros
- 1970 Jacques-Yves Cousteau uses his research vessel RV Calypso to explore Blue Holes and Tongue of the Ocean.
- 1972 Androsia Batik Factory opens
- 1972 International Field Studies at Forfar Field Station opens
- 1973 Lynden Pindling, Member of Parliament for Kemp's Bay on South Andros, becomes first Prime Minister of independent Bahamas
- 1974 Bahamas Agricultural Research, Training and Development project initiated, fostering agriculture on Andros
- 1983 Mennonite Farm established near Blanket Sound
- 1984 Queen Elizabeth II visits Andros to dedicate Queen's Park
- 1997 Andros Conservancy and Trust founded, dedicated to the ecological preservation of the islands
- 2002 Creation of first National Parks and Marine Protected Areas on Andros
- 2014 The Bahamas Agriculture and Marine Science Institute (BAMSI) opens.

== Geography ==
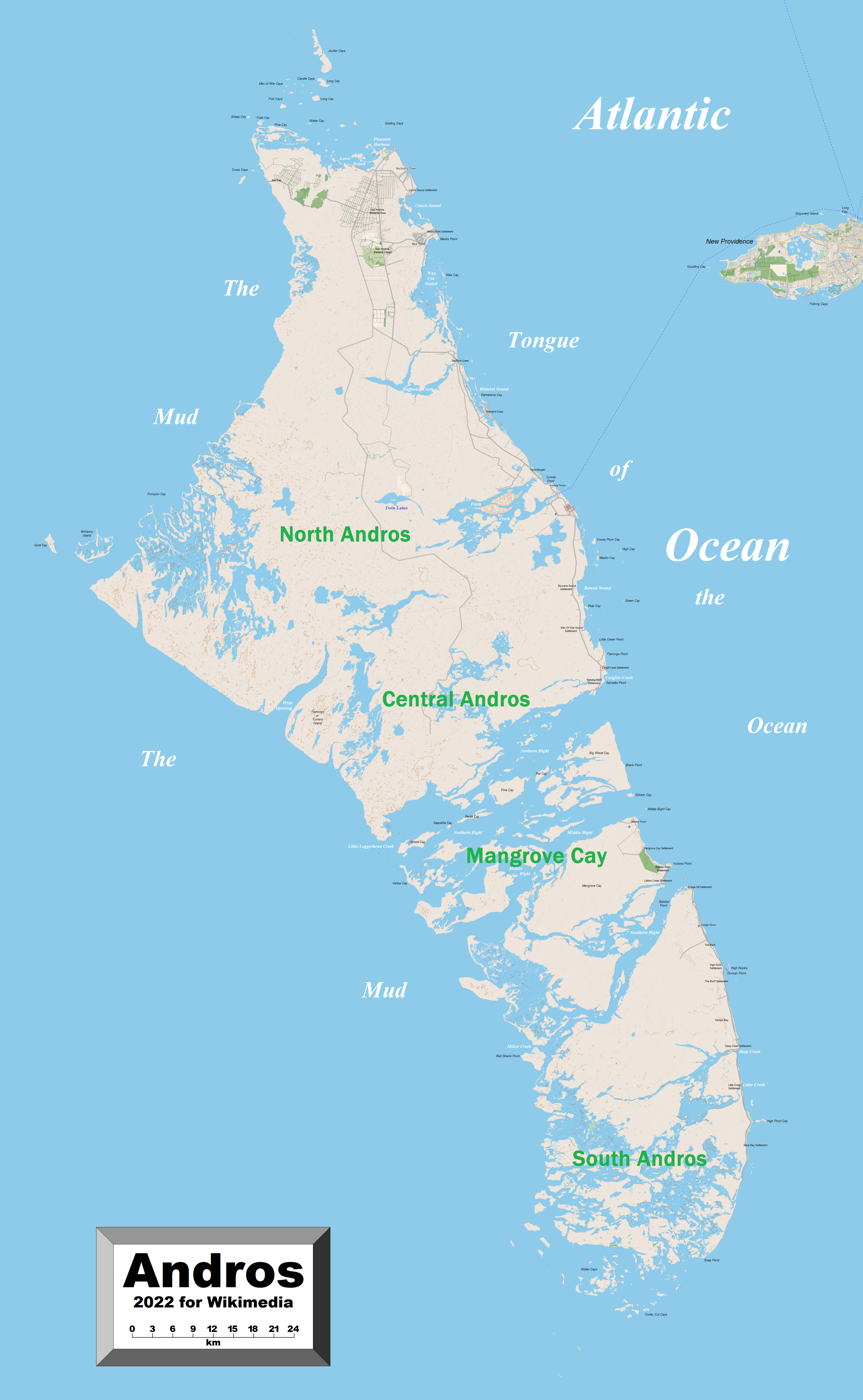
Map of Andros

Noteworthy for a unique combination of marine features and ecosystems, Andros is bordered on the east by the 2,000-metre-deep (6,600 ft) Tongue of the Ocean. The Andros Barrier Reef is the world's sixth longest. It runs for 225 km (140 mi), averaging a distance of 2–3 km (1–2 mi) from the Andros shore. The extensive flats of the Great Bahama Bank lie to the west, northwest and south of Andros. The island has the world's largest collection of blue holes.

Geographically, North Andros is the sixth largest island in the West Indies, at roughly 6,000 km^{2} (2,300 sq mi) in area and 167 km (104 mi) long and 64 km (40 mi) wide at its widest point, and the 153rd largest island on Earth. If all three main islands are included, Andros is the fifth-largest island in the West Indies, after Cuba, Hispaniola, Jamaica and Puerto Rico. Although comparable in total area to the state of Rhode Island (3,140 km^{2}, population 1.05 million) together with Long Island, New York (3,600 km^{2}, population 7.5 million), Andros only has a population of approximately 8,000, almost all of whom are settled in a thin strip near the Queen Elizabeth Highway running along the island's eastern coast.

Andros is 50 km (30 mi) west across the Tongue of the Ocean from The Bahamas' national capital of Nassau on New Providence Island. Its northern tip lies 233 km (145 mi) from Fort Lauderdale, Florida. Geologically and geographically The Bahamas, including Andros, are not located in the Caribbean, whose northern boundary is the Windward Passage, but rather in the Atlantic Ocean. Historically, the nation was part of the British West Indies and is considered culturally to be part of the Caribbean. The Bahamian dialect of the English language is distinctively Caribbean in character, similar to those of Jamaica and the Cayman Islands, also formerly part of the British West Indies.

The township of Fresh Creek is home to the Atlantic Undersea Test and Evaluation Center (AUTEC), operated by the U.S. Navy. The United Kingdom and United States conduct special operations training, and sonar and submarine research in the Tongue of the Ocean. The U.S. Coast Guard also runs rescue and drug interdiction operations from AUTEC.

== Climate ==
Andros lies just north of the Tropic of Cancer, with moderate temperature range affected by its relative proximity to the Gulf Stream to the west. The island has a tropical climate with only two seasons, summer (May–November) and winter (December–April). Midsummer temperatures range from 27–29 °C (81–84 °F) with a relative humidity of 60 to 100 percent. Winter temperatures range from 21–24 °C (70–75 °F) and can drop to 5 °C (41 °F) after dark. Andros Island is hit by a hurricane an average of every 2.5 years. The Great Florida Hurricane of 1929 is known in The Bahamas as The Great Andros Hurricane. Notable strikes in the modern era have included Hurricanes Betsy (1965), David (1979), Arlene (1987), Andrew (1992), Lili (1996), Floyd (1999), Michelle (2001), Wilma (2005) and Matthew (2016). Matthew caused widespread flooding and devastation on the north end of the island around Morgan's Bluff, Lowe Sound, and Nicholl's Town. Many locals claim Matthew was the worst hurricane seen on Andros in nearly 90 years.

== Economy ==
The largest employers on Andros Island are the Bahamian government and the AUTEC base at Fresh Creek.

Despite its small population, Andros Island has several ongoing commercial ventures. Western Air maintains its headquarters in a modern facility at the San Andros airport. A Mennonite mission-run commercial farm was founded near Blanket Sound in 1983, which grows everything from habanero peppers to sorghum and potatoes, and has numerous fruit orchards and honey bee hives. The Mennonites also run the largest car repair and carpentry shops on the island. Androsia, a hand-crafted batik factory founded at Fresh Creek in 1972, produces a vibrant, colourful fabric that has become part of the national dress and identity of The Bahamas. GreenLife Growers, a Bahamian native tree nursery at Young Sound, provides landscaping material to real estate developers and government projects throughout The Bahamas.

Commercial fishing remains a mainstay of the island's economy: conch, lobster, snapper and grouper are all commercially harvested for sale locally and in Nassau's fish markets. Seasonal crabbing—catching crabs and fattening them in pens for sale in Nassau—provides a cash crop for locals to supplement their income.

Local handicrafts in the Black Seminole style—particularly wood carvings and woven baskets—are a cottage industry in the settlement of Red Bays. A sample of Red Bays baskets is held by the Smithsonian Institution in Washington, DC.

A fledgling conservation industry on Andros is dedicated to preserving the island's unique ecosystems, working in partnership with the Bahamian government (Bahamas National Trust) and such varied non-governmental organizations as The Nature Conservancy and Project AWARE of the Professional Association of Dive Instructors (PADI). They supported legislation to found the Central Andros National Park in 2002. Most of the island's conservation efforts funnel through the non-profit nongovernmental organization, Andros Conservancy & Trust Bahamas. ANCAT's efforts are closely tied to encouraging eco-tourism, to generate economic incentives to preserve the existing varied habitats of the island. GreenForce Global Volunteering/Bahamas, an international NGO based in the UK, conducts environmental research from its operation at Stafford Creek on North Andros. It also offers 3- to 12-week dive training, and marine and environmental science programs for conservationists and others.

It also is where The Bahamas Agriculture and Marine Science Institute (BAMSI) is located.

=== Tourism ===
Tourism is Andros Island's largest industry, and the largest private employer. The Bahamian tourism industry markets Andros as the least-explored island in the chain. From Nicholls Town in the north to Little Creek in the south are 35–40 hotels, motels, resorts, guest houses and lodges (the number varies), with a total of approximately 400 rooms. Tourists are composed primarily of scuba divers, attracted to the barrier reef, Tongue of the Ocean, and the Blue Holes; bonefishing anglers, and others looking for relaxation.

Andros Island was the site of two of the first dive-dedicated resorts in the world, and the first in The Bahamas, both founded by Canadians. Small Hope Bay Lodge near Fresh Creek was founded by Dick Birch in 1960. It continues to operate as a dive resort under the ownership and management of Dick Birch's children.

The second resort was the Andros Reef Inn located in Blanket Sound founded by Archie Forfar in the 1960s. After his death in a diving accident in 1971, his property was purchased by International Field Studies, Inc. of Columbus, Ohio, in 1977. Renamed Forfar Field Station, the site is used for science education and research of the surrounding reef, marine, and island ecology for Bahamian and American middle and high school students, as well, as college students, non-profit organizations, and researchers.

Andros Island is surrounded by thousands of square kilometres of fishable flats, home to permit, tarpon, and especially bonefish. The island is known as the bonefish capital of the world. Bonefish are considered among the world's premier gamefish for anglers. Other varieties of fishing are available on Andros. Deep sea fishing beyond the reef in the Tongue of the Ocean offers dorado, tuna, sailfish, wahoo, and jacks. Locals fish regularly on the reef for abundant snapper and grouper.

== Festivals ==
Andros sponsors a number of festivals: Crabfest at Fresh Creek each June, the annual regatta at Morgan's Bluff, Conch Festival, a local Junkanoo and Goombay festival between Christmas and New Year's, the Pirates' Festival, and the Annual Seafood Splash & Chickcharnie Festival. In addition, ANCAT sponsors numerous ecologically oriented events for tourists and locals.

== Flora and fauna ==
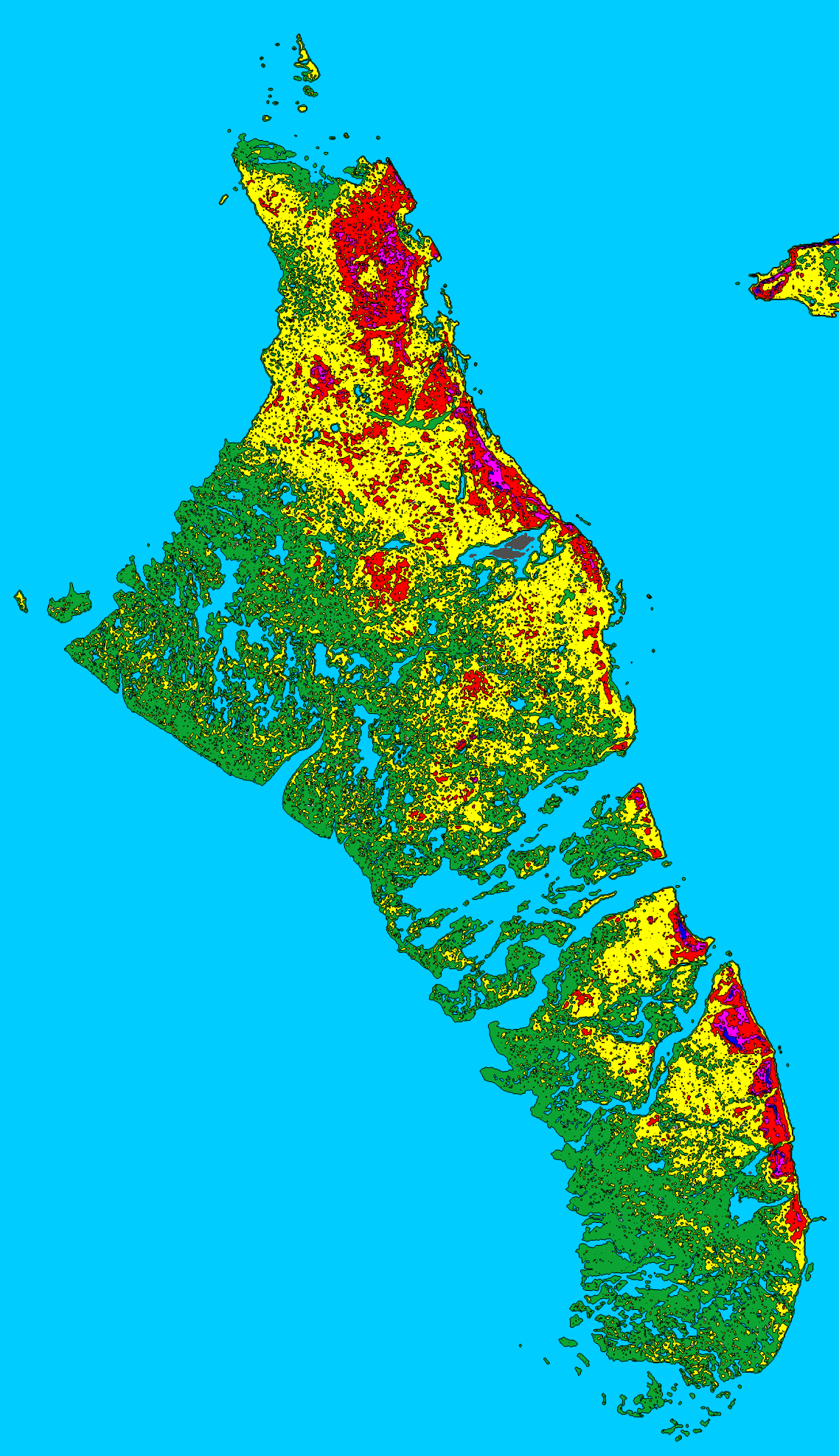
Topographic map of Andros Island. Green: 0–15 ft (0.0–4.6 m) Yellow: 15–30 ft (4.6–9.1 m) Red: 30–45 ft (9.1–13.7 m) Violet: 45–60 ft (14–18 m) Dark blue: 60+ ft (18.3+ m)

Andros exhibits greater botanical diversity than any other island in The Bahamas. The presence of its barrier reef and the Tongue of the Ocean give the island a great zoological diversity. Among the various land ecosystems are hardwood coppice, pineyard, scrub, saltwater marsh, rocky and sandy beaches, palm savannas and mangroves. Non-coastal areas on Andros are referred to generically as 'the bush'. Coastal mangrove flats and estuaries are referred to as 'the swash', or salt water marsh. In the 1960s and 1970s the Owens Lumber company, a US-owned company that bought out a number of Bahamian lumber interests, clear cut and deforested much of the indigenous pineyards that grew on North Andros. Timber was not harvested on western Andros because these forests are surrounded by wetlands and could not be economically harvested. It is currently home to some of the largest pines remaining in The Bahamas. What is found on the North Andros landmass today are over-crowded forests of mainly young trees.

Andros has The Bahamas' only freshwater river, contributing to its biodiversity. Thousands of kilometres of underground water from rainwater collect in aquifers below the island's surface. Nineteen million litres of freshwater are shipped daily to Nassau by barge through the pumping station located in Morgan's Bluff.

=== Andros Island iguana ===
Andros Island is home to several species of lizards, including the Andros Island iguana (Cyclura cychlura cychlura), a large endangered subspecies of the Northern Bahamian rock iguana. The Andros Island iguana is listed as an Endangered species and can be found on the IUCN Red List, with a wild population of 3,500 individuals remaining on the island.

=== Marine life ===
The barrier reef and the Tongue of the Ocean, together with mangrove swamps, rocky tidal pools, and estuaries, provide breeding and growing habitats for a wide variety of young marine life. Andros has a variety of close-to-shore and on-shore ecosystems that may be unique on Earth: tidal inland and ocean blue holes, shallow sand and mud flats, tidal estuaries, mangrove swamps, the pelagic ecozone of the 2,000 m (6,000 ft) drop-off only 1.6 km (1 mi) from shore, the world's third-largest barrier reef, and huge freshwater aquifers. The marine biosphere is fed by both the teeming life of the mangrove marshes and estuaries on the mainland, and the upwelling of cool water from the Tongue of the Ocean, resulting in an unparallelled variety of sea life.

Humpback whales, which are found in all the world's oceans, follow a regular migration route, summering in temperate and polar waters for feeding, and wintering in tropical waters for mating and calving. Humpbacks used to be common in the Tongue of the Ocean off Andros, and are still seen infrequently. Pilot whales are also seen off the coast of Andros.

Inside the Andros Barrier Reef, staghorn, elkhorn and other corals are found in shallows 3–6 m (10–20 ft) deep. Beyond the shallow reefs are tiny cays and islets, from which the sea bottom gradually deepens until at a depth of between 21 and 37 m (70 and 120 ft) comes "The Wall", with its plunge 2,000 m (6,000 ft) into the abyss of the Tongue of the Ocean.

Four species of turtles are found in Andros' waters: loggerhead, green, hawksbill and, rarely, the leatherback.

=== Birds ===
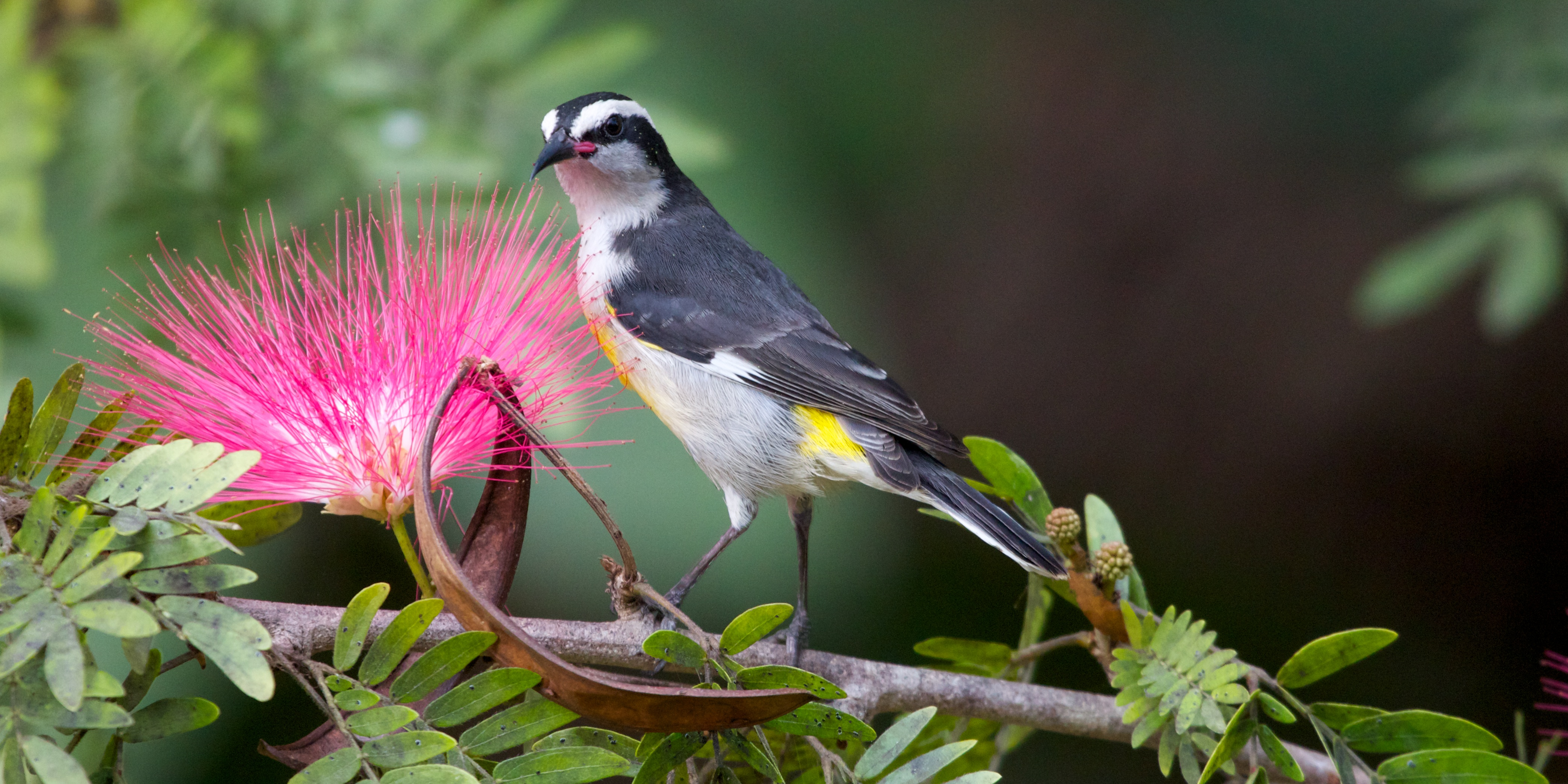
Bananaquit in North Andros

Most resident bird species of The Bahamas are believed to have come northward from the West Indies, as winds and sea currents favour migration from the south and southeast. Some 225 species are known in the islands. Andros, with its vast undeveloped land, is home to many of them. The Bahama oriole is unique to Andros Island. Critically endangered, it has an estimated remaining population of as few as several hundred. The great lizard cuckoo is found only on Andros, New Providence, and Eleuthera. The rare Kirtland's warbler—an estimated 600 remain—was first seen on the island in 1879 and some individuals winter on Andros. The endangered migratory Atlantic subspecies of the piping plover favours the rocky shores and sandy beaches of Andros. Other rare and uncommon birds found in the Andros environ include the Bahama yellowthroat, Bahama woodstar, Bahama swallow, West Indian whistling duck and Key West quail dove.

=== Orchids ===
More than 50 species of wild orchids thrive in the more than 104 km^{2} (40 sq mi) of subtropical forests and the swamps of Andros. Many are endemic, including three native species of the climbing orchid Vanilla. Commercial flower collectors have been known to set fire to the pineland coppices to collect the sharp-petalled bletias (Bletia purpurea) that flourish in ashy soil. The orchid genus Epidendrum has nine species endemic to The Bahamas, all of which can be found on Andros.

=== Legendary creatures ===
According to local lore, two mythical creatures are endemic to Andros: the Lusca and the Chickcharney (also spelled "Chickcharnie".) The Lusca, a gigantic half-octopus, half-shark, supposedly swallows whole boats. The Chickcharney, furry and feathered and 1 m (3 ft) tall, has one red eye and three-toed claws. It has been suggested to be based on the prehistoric barn owl Tyto pollens, although remains have never been found on Andros and the youngest fossil bones are from a layer before the arrival of the first humans, the Lucayans.

== Blue holes ==
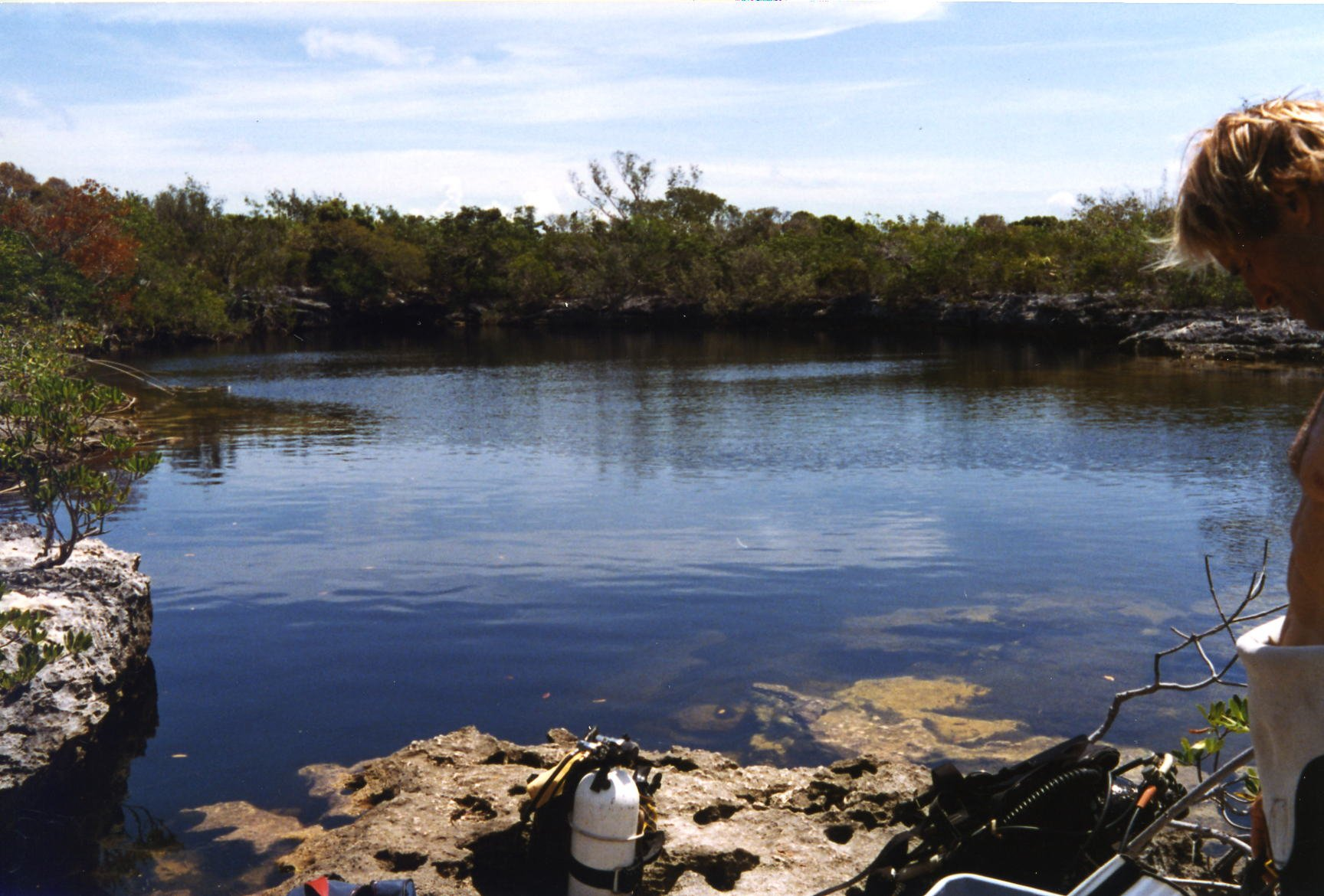
Guardian Blue Hole

The island's blue holes are water-filled cave systems, which attract divers from all over the world.

All the main islands of The Bahamas have blue holes, but those of Andros are the best known. Andros has 178 on land with at least 50 in the sea. Blue holes can best be described as entrances to the intricate cave systems that run underneath the island and sea floor. Their openings can be found among the shallow creeks, inland lakes, and the shallow banks of The Bahamas. The caves, which have developed within the Bahamian carbonate platforms, can be laterally and vertically very extensive. Lateral cave passages can extend to several kilometres and vertically may range in depth from ten to several hundred metres.

Noted oceanographer and environmentalist Jacques Cousteau visited Andros Island in 1970 to explore and film the Andros Blue Holes. The video of this expedition, called The Secret of the Sunken Caves, is included in the 2005 Cousteau video collection, The Jacques Cousteau Odyssey: The Complete Collection. Cousteau explored several ocean blue holes, and the inland blue holes known as Uncle Charlie's, Church's, and the Guardian.

National Geographic magazine has featured the Andros Blue Holes several times over the past thirty years, most recently in August 2010.

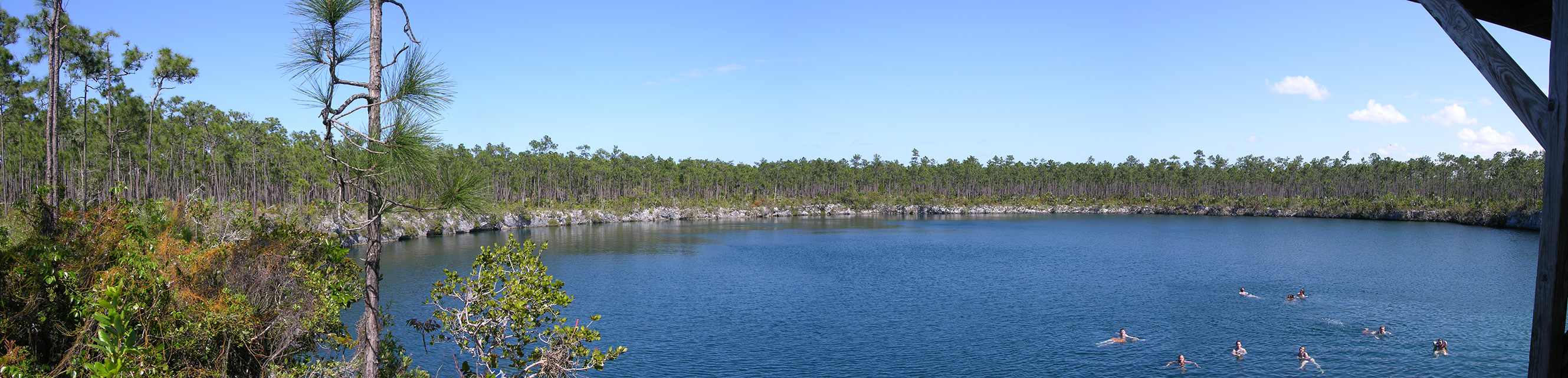
Church's Blue Hole

== Transportation ==
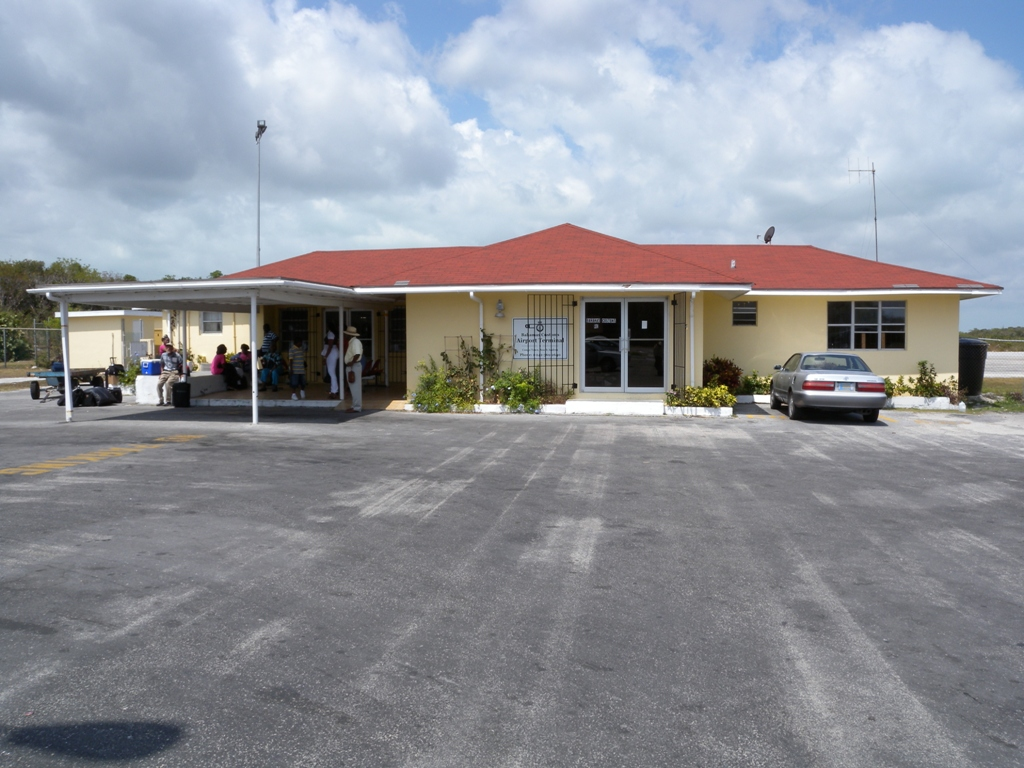
South Andros Airport

Andros Island has four airports with paved runways: San Andros Airport at Nicholls Town, Andros Town International Airport located at Fresh Creek, the Clarence A. Bain Airport at Mangrove Cay and Congo Town Airport in South Andros. Andros Town International is an international port of entry for private pilots. The island is served by multiple daily flights from Nassau by [(Jet 1)], BahamasAir, Watermakers Air Western Air, and LeAir—the flight to any of the four airports is 15–25 minutes. Daily scheduled flights to Nassau from London, Paris, New York City, Boston, Atlanta, Philadelphia, Houston, Dallas, Jacksonville, Miami, Fort Lauderdale, Palm Beach, Orlando and other major cities provide easy connection from Andros to the rest of the world.

Regularly scheduled charters provide direct service to Andros Town from Miami and Fort Lauderdale, Florida.

Andros is connected to Nassau by Sea-Link ferry, which runs daily to Morgan's Bluff on the north end of the island and Fresh Creek in central Andros. It is also reachable by mailboat from Nassau and for inter-island travel with stops at numerous Andros settlements. There is no public transport on Andros Island, but a private shuttle bus service on North Andros connects Nicholls Town with Behring Point. Taxi service is available at all four airports.

== Political organisation ==
Andros is politically divided into four Districts (North Andros, Central Andros, South Andros and Mangrove Cay) and ten townships. (Mastic Point, Lowe Sound, Nicholls Town, Staniard Creek, Fresh Creek, Cargill Creek, The Bluff, Long Bay Cays, Kemps Bay, Deep Creek). It is represented in the national parliament by two seats—North Andros and South Andros. Dozens of tiny settlements have developed along the island's east coast, (i.e. Blanket Sound, Love Hill, Davis Creek, Small Hope Bay, Calabash Bay, Bowen Sound, Behring Point, Little Creek). There is one settlement on the west coast, Red Bays, historically settled by American fugitive slaves and Black Seminoles, located at the island's northwestern tip.

Districts of Andros Island	Chief Councillor	Establishment	Seat of Local Government	Townships	Map
North Andros District	Brian O'Neal Cleare	1999	Nicholls Town	Mastic Point, Lowe Sound, Nicholl's Town	
Central Andros District	Clyde Duncombe	1999	Fresh Creek	Staniard Creek, Fresh Creek, Cargill Creek	
Mangrove Cay District	Brian Moxey	1999	Moxey Town	none	
South Andros District	Zebedee Rolle	1999	Kemps Bay	The Bluff, Long Bay Cays, Kemps Bay, Deep Creek	

== Religion ==
There are a number of church denominations represented within Andros. In North Andros, the Anglican Church has a presence through St Margaret's Parish. This parish consists of two churches, St Margaret's located in the settlement of Nicholls Town and St Mary Magdalene located in the settlement of Mastic Point. There are also Methodist churches in Stafford Creek, Nicholl's Town and Mastic Point.

The Roman Catholic Archdiocese of Nassau provides clergy for parishes throughout Andros. On South Andros Sacred Heart parish is in Little Creek and St. Robert Bellarmine parish is in High Rock. Mangrove Cay is served by St. Benedict's parish and Central Andros is served by St. John Chrysostom parish in Fresh Creek and Christ the King parish in Cargill Creek. Catholic services are also provided on Saturday evening at the AUTEC Navy Base chapel.

Blanket Sound Mennonite Church is located in Blanket Sound on Andros. The congregation is affiliated with the Eastern Pennsylvania Mennonite Church.

== Gallery ==
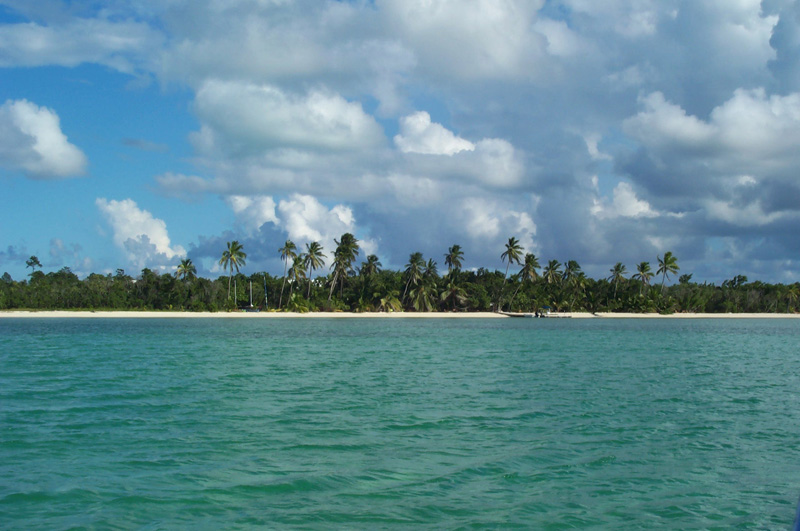
South Andros Island, at Tiamo

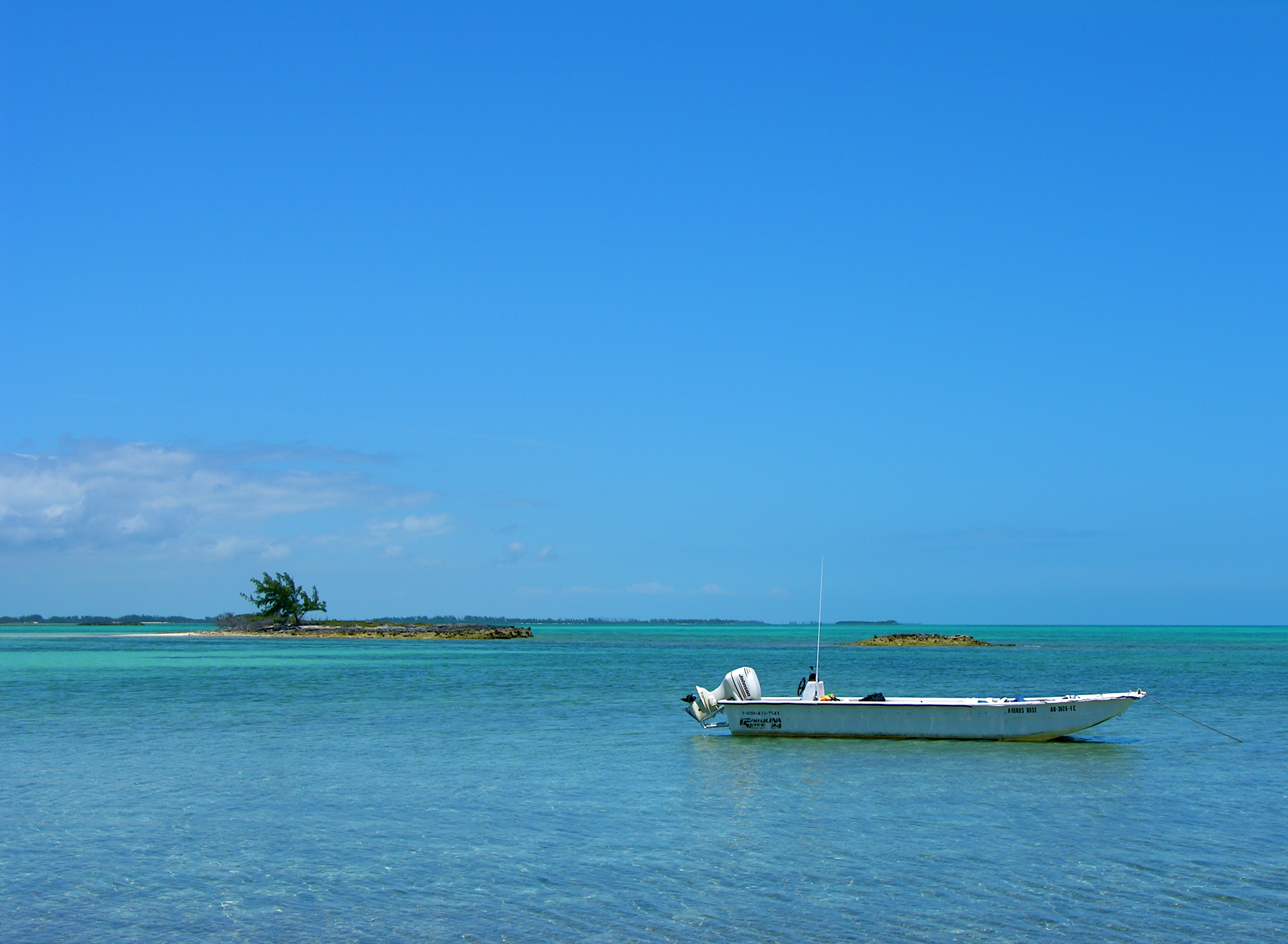
View from Saddleback Cay

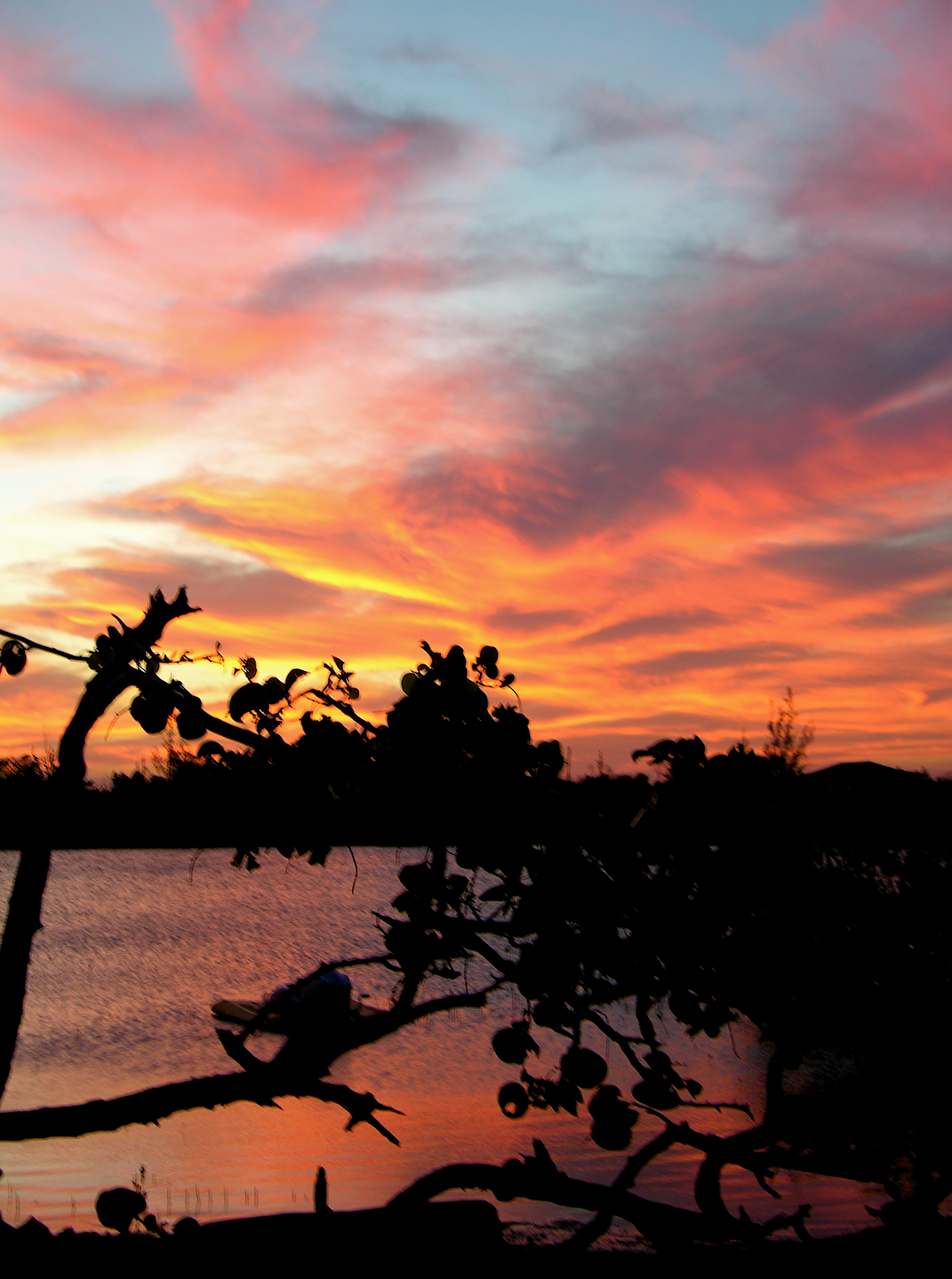
Sunset from Blanket Sound

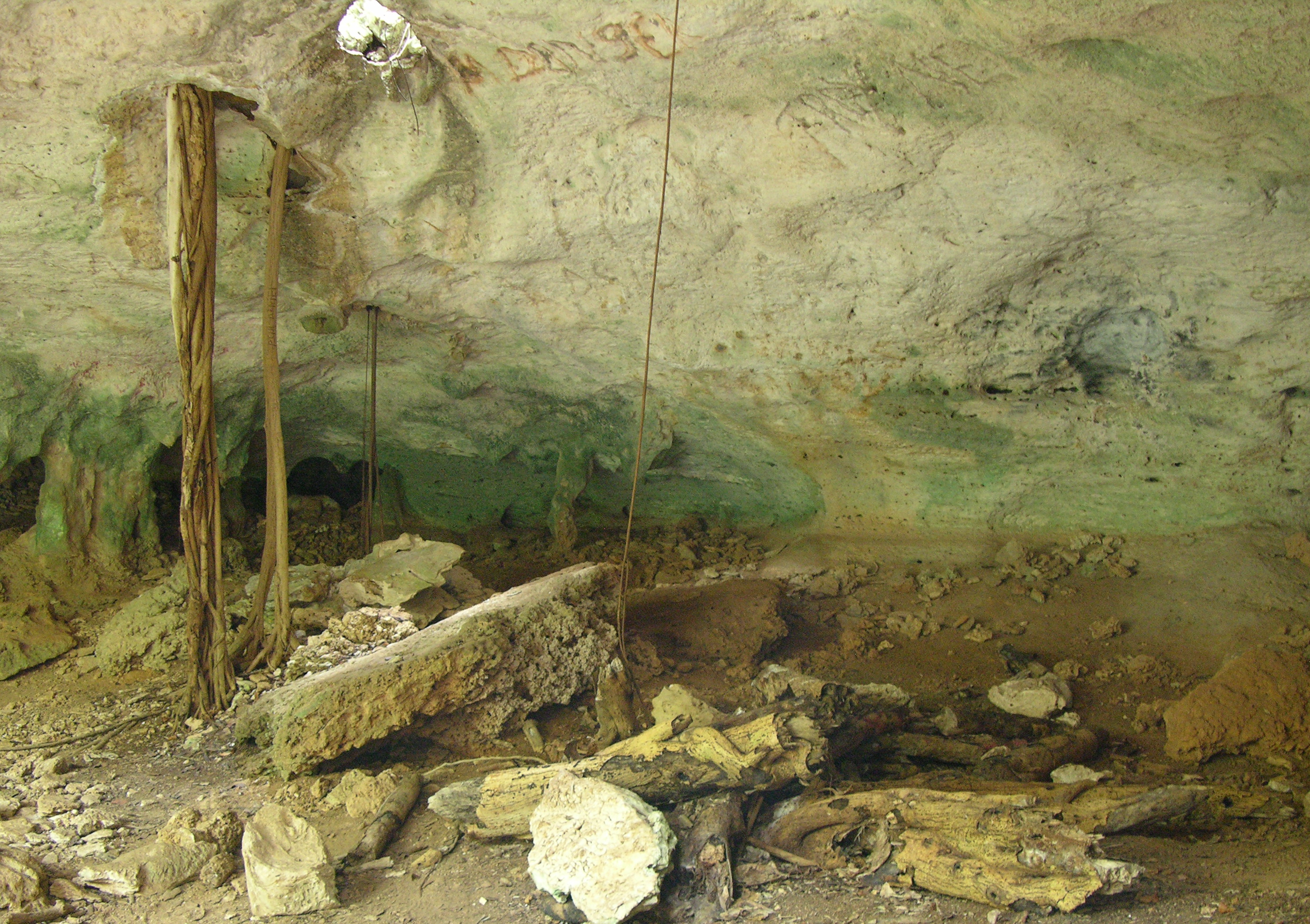
Captain Morgan's Cave

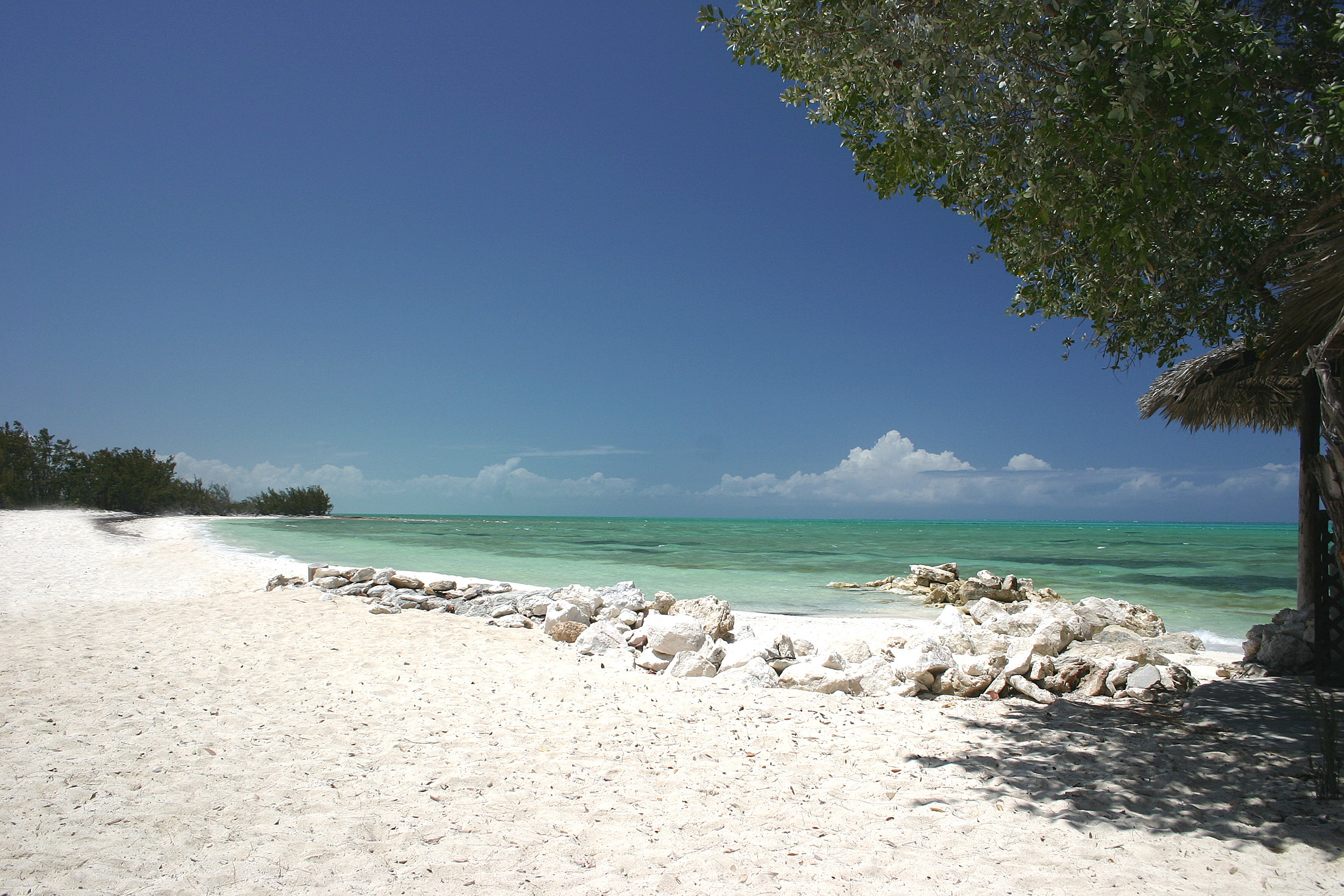
The North Beach of Small Hope Bay Lodge

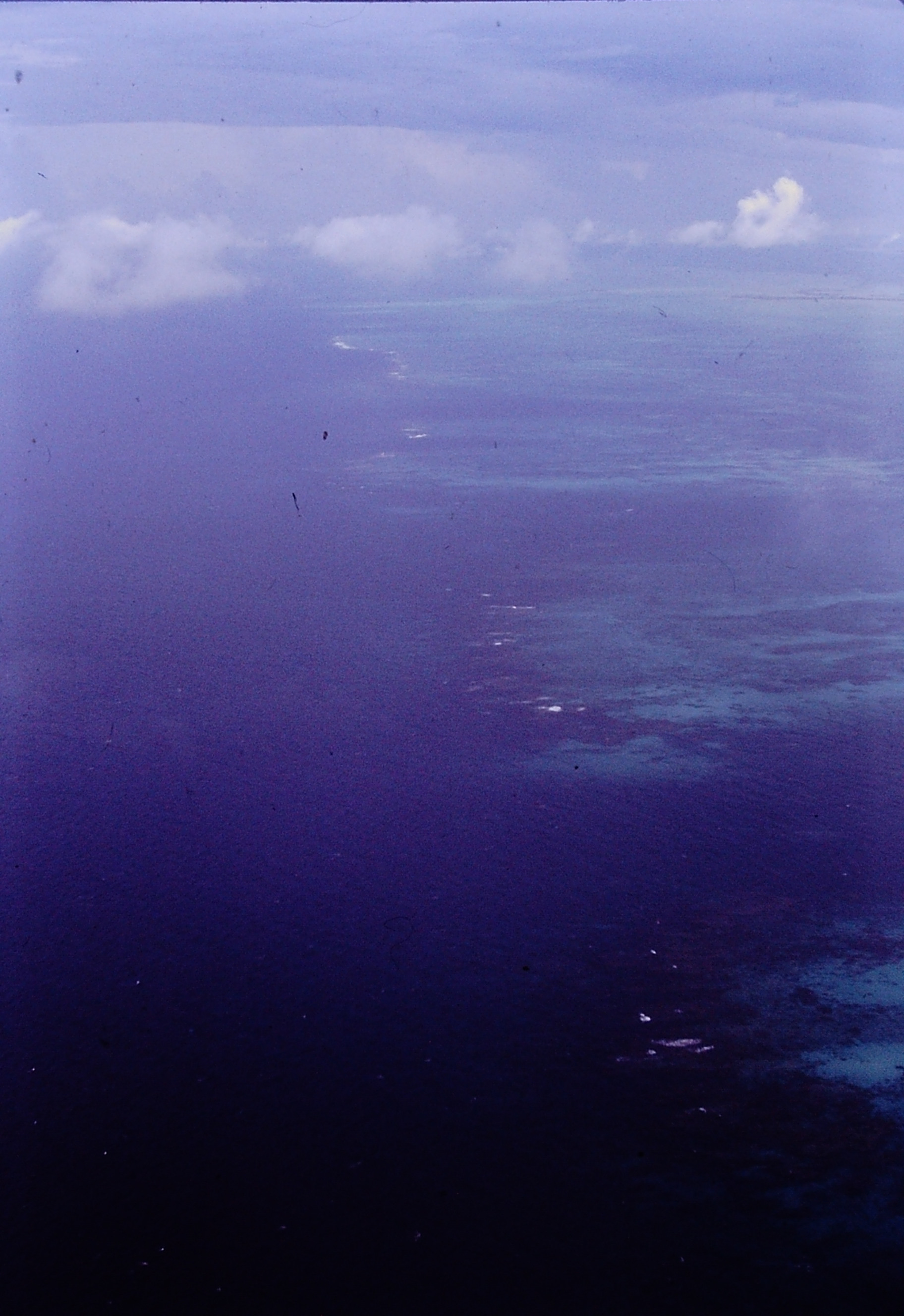
Air photo of barrier reefs along east side of northern Andros (1999)

== Legacy ==
- The U.S. National Park Service is working with The Bahamas, particularly the African Bahamanian Museum and Research Center (ABAC) in Nassau, to develop interpretive programs at Red Bays, Andros as an international site connected to the National Underground Railroad Network to Freedom Trail, which American slaves used to escape to freedom.

== See also ==
- Tongue of the Ocean
- Atlantic Undersea Test and Evaluation Center
- Chickcharney
