= 15th Bahamian Parliament =

Parliament of The Bahamas elected in 2026

←	14th
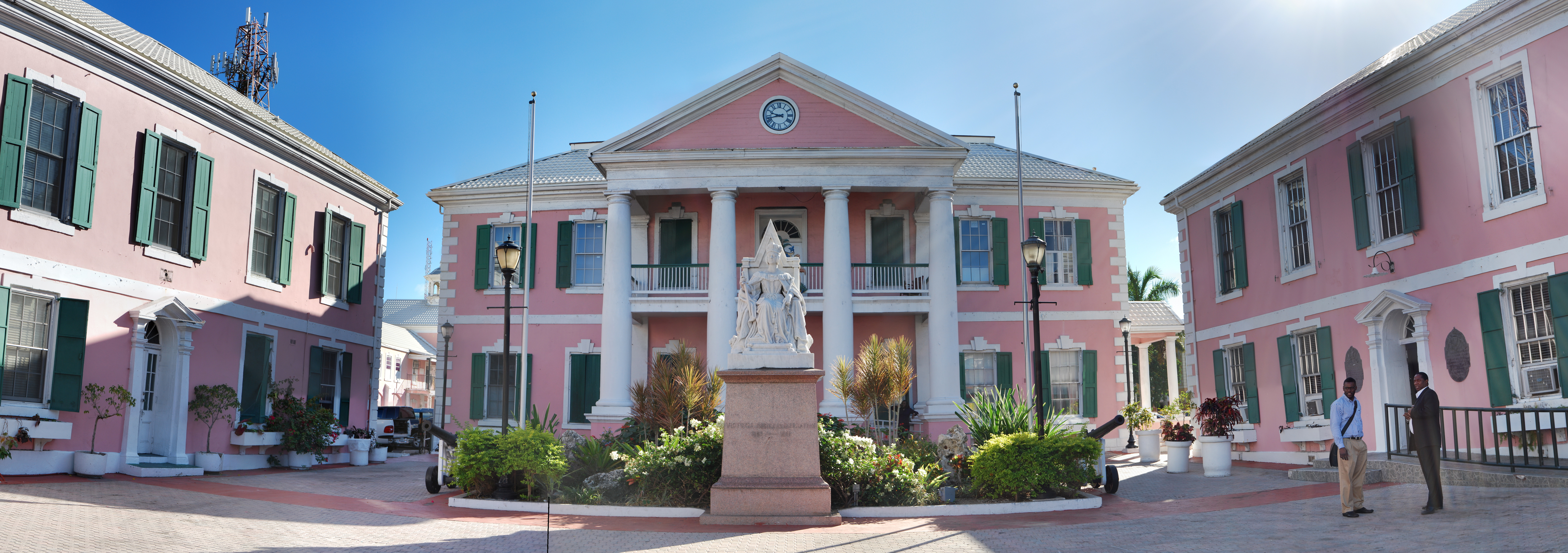
- Bahamian Parliament Building

Overview
- Jurisdiction: The Bahamas
- Meeting place: Bahamian Parliament Building
- Term: 20 May 2026 –
- Election: 2026 Bahamian general election

House of Assembly
- Members: 41
- Speaker: Patricia Deveaux
- Prime Minister: Philip "Brave" Davis
- Leader of the Opposition: Michael Pintard

Senate
- Members: 16
- President: Lashell Adderley

Crown-in-Parliament
- Monarch: Charles III
- Governor-General: Cynthia A. Pratt

The 15th Bahamian Parliament is the Parliament of The Bahamas elected following the 2026 Bahamian general election, which was held on 12 May 2026. The election was called early by Prime Minister Philip Davis, with Parliament dissolved on 8 April 2026 and the writs of election issued the following day.

The Progressive Liberal Party (PLP) was returned to government with 33 of the 41 seats in the House of Assembly, while the opposition Free National Movement (FNM) won eight seats. Davis was sworn in for a second consecutive term as prime minister on 14 May 2026. His re-election made him the first Bahamian prime minister to win a second consecutive term since the 1997 election.

== Election and formation ==
The 2026 general election was held under revised electoral boundaries, which increased the number of House of Assembly constituencies from 39 to 41. The two new constituencies were St James and Bimini and Berry Islands. The PLP won both of the newly created seats.

Following the election, Davis was sworn in as prime minister at Government House on 14 May 2026. Senior cabinet ministers were sworn in on 15 May, and the appointment of the Cabinet and ministerial team was completed on 16 May.

The 15th Parliament opened on 20 May 2026. At the state opening, Governor-General Cynthia A. Pratt delivered the Speech from the Throne, setting out the government's legislative agenda for the new term.

== Composition ==
The House of Assembly elected in 2026 consisted of 33 PLP members and eight FNM members.

The Senate is the appointed upper chamber of the Parliament of The Bahamas. Under the Constitution, it consists of 16 senators appointed by the governor-general: nine on the advice of the prime minister, four on the advice of the leader of the opposition, and three on the advice of the prime minister after consultation with the leader of the opposition.

On 18 May 2026, the nine government senators were presented with their instruments of appointment: Lashell Adderley, Keenan Johnson, Robyn Lynes, Ja'Ann Major, Latrae Rahming, Kevin Simmons, D'Asante Small, Clint Watson and Keno Wong. After the election, former basketball player and FNM candidate Rick Fox was appointed to one of the opposition's four Senate seats.

== Members ==
=== House of Assembly ===
Constituency	Party	Member
Bain Town and Grants Town	PLP	Wayde Watson
Bamboo Town	PLP	Patricia Deveaux
Bimini and Berry Islands	PLP	Randy Rolle
Carmichael	PLP	Keith Bell
Cat Island, Rum Cay & San Salvador	PLP	Philip "Brave" Davis
Central and South Abaco	PLP	Bradley R. Fox
Central and South Eleuthera	PLP	Clay Sweeting
Central Grand Bahama	FNM	Frazette Gibson
Centreville	PLP	Jomo Campbell
East Grand Bahama	FNM	Kwasi Thompson
Englerston	PLP	Glenys Hanna Martin
Elizabeth	PLP	JoBeth Coleby-Davis
Fort Charlotte	PLP	Sebastian Bastian
Fox Hill	PLP	Frederick A. Mitchell
Freetown	FNM	Lincoln Deal II
Garden Hills	PLP	Mario Bowleg
Golden Gates	PLP	Pia Glover-Rolle
Golden Isles	PLP	Darron Pickstock
Killarney	FNM	Michela Barnett-Ellis
Long Island	FNM	Andre Rollins
Mangrove Cay and South Andros	PLP	Leon Lundy
Marathon	PLP	Lisa Rahming
Marco City	FNM	Michael Pintard
MICAL	FNM	J. Leo Ferguson
Mount Moriah	PLP	McKell Bonaby
Nassau Village	PLP	Jamahl Strachan
North Abaco	PLP	Kirk Cornish
North Andros	PLP	Leonardo Lightbourne
North Eleuthera	PLP	Sylvannus Petty
Pineridge	PLP	Ginger Moxey
Pinewood	PLP	Myles Laroda
Saint Anne's	FNM	Adrian White
Saint Barnabas	PLP	Michael Halkitis
Sea Breeze	PLP	Leslia Miller-Brice
South Beach	PLP	Bacchus Rolle
Southern Shores	PLP	S. Obie Roberts
St. James	PLP	Owen C. B. Wells
Tall Pines	PLP	Michael Darville
The Exumas and Ragged Island	PLP	Chester Cooper
West Grand Bahama	PLP	Kingsley Smith
Yamacraw	PLP	Zane Lightbourne

== Senate ==
The following senators were appointed following the 2026 Bahamian general election:

Party	Member
PLP	Lashell Adderley
PLP	Barbara Cartwright
PLP	Jerome Fitzgerald
FNM	Rick Fox
PLP	Wayne Munroe
PLP	Keenan Johnson
PLP	Clint Watson
PLP	Keno Wong
PLP	Robyn Lynes
PLP	Ja'Ann Major
PLP	D'Asante Small
PLP	Latrae Rahming
PLP	Kevin Simmons
FNM	Elsworth Johnson
FNM	Arinthia Komolafe
FNM	Trevor Johnson

== See also ==
- 2026 Bahamian general election
- Politics of the Bahamas
