= St. James (Bahamas Parliament constituency) =

Bahamas parliamentary constituency

- Constituency for the House of Assembly
- District: New Providence
- Electorate: 5,149 (2025)
- Major settlements: Adelaide Beach, Coral Harbour, Albany

Current constituency
- Created: 2026
- Seats: 1
- Party: Progressive Liberal Party
- Member: Owen C. B. Wells

St. James is a parliamentary constituency represented in the House of Assembly of the Bahamas. It elects one member of parliament (MP) using the first-past-the-post voting system. The constituency was created for the 2026 Bahamian general election and has been represented since then by Owen C. B. Wells of the Progressive Liberal Party (PLP).

The constituency was created in 2026 after the Constituency Boundaries Commission recommended two new seats as part of a redistribution intended to address population shifts and voter parity.

== History ==
In October 2025, Bahamian media reported that the Boundaries Commission was considering creating new constituencies by dividing the existing Killarney seat, citing the size of its electorate.

In its report dated 29 December 2025, the Constituencies Commission said that the two new seats would be "St. James" on New Providence and "Bimini & Berry Islands", and that no public consultations or meetings were held during the commission's work. The report was tabled in the House of Assembly on 8 January 2026, confirming the creation of the St. James constituency in western New Providence and increasing the number of constituencies from 39 to 41.

The report's annexes specified that St. James would be formed by transferring polling divisions from the Golden Isles, Killarney, Tall Pines and Southern Shores constituencies, including:

- Golden Isles: polling divisions 1, 2, 5, 10 and 14
- Killarney: polling division 3, polling division 11, and parts of polling division 4
- Tall Pines: polling divisions 4, 7 and 12
- Southern Shores: polling division 4

Residents interviewed by Bahamian media gave mixed views on whether the boundary change was necessary or politically motivated, and highlighted long-standing infrastructure concerns in parts of the new constituency.

The new boundaries were formalised in the House of Assembly Revision of Boundaries and Re-distribution of Seats Order, 2026 (S.I. No. 5 of 2026), which came into force on 16 January 2026 and applies from the next general election. The constituency was first contested at the 2026 general election, when PLP candidate Owen C. B. Wells defeated Free National Movement deputy leader Shanendon Cartwright.

== Geography ==
The constituency covers parts of western and southwestern New Providence. Bahamian media reports described it as drawing polling divisions from areas including Adelaide Beach, Coral Harbour, parts of South Ocean, and sections formerly in Golden Isles, Killarney and Southern Shores.

The constituency's legal boundaries are defined in the 2026 boundaries order.

== Demographics ==
The commission's summary tables listed 5,045 registered voters for the St. James area in 2021 and 5,149 in 2025, across eleven polling divisions.

== Members of Parliament ==
Election	Parliament	Member	Party
2026	15th	Owen C. B. Wells	PLP

== Elections ==
The constituency was first contested at the 2026 general election.

In January 2026, the Progressive Liberal Party ratified attorney Owen C. B. Wells as its candidate for St. James. In February 2026, the Free National Movement said it would ratify Shanendon Cartwright for the constituency and listed him as its candidate.

=== 2026 general election ===
General Election 2026: St. James
Party	Candidate	Votes	%	±%
PLP	Owen Wells	1,620	46.50	New
FNM	Shanendon Cartwright	1,477	42.39	New
COI	Latoya Bain	377	10.82	New
Independent	Craig Powell	7	0.20	New
Independent	Elkin Benedict Sutherland	3	0.09	New
Turnout		3,484		

== See also ==
- List of National Assembly constituencies of The Bahamas
