= Trevor Johnson (politician) =

Bahamian politician

The Honourable Trevor Johnson Senator

Member of the Senate of the Bahamas
- Incumbent
- Assumed office 19 May 2026

Personal details
- Born: August 18, 1995 (age 31)
- Party: Free National Movement

Dr. Trevor Oneil Johnson Jr (born 1995) is a Bahamian politician from the Free National Movement (FNM).

== Career ==
Dr. Johnson works as a professor at the University of the Bahamas and was a former Biology and Health Science Teacher at Eight Mile Rock High School. Johnson was a potential candidate to replace Iram Lewis in Central Grand Bahama at the 2026 Bahamian general election. Following the 2026 Bahamian general election, he was appointed to the Senate for the opposition.

== See also ==
- 15th Bahamian Parliament
