= Darren Henfield =

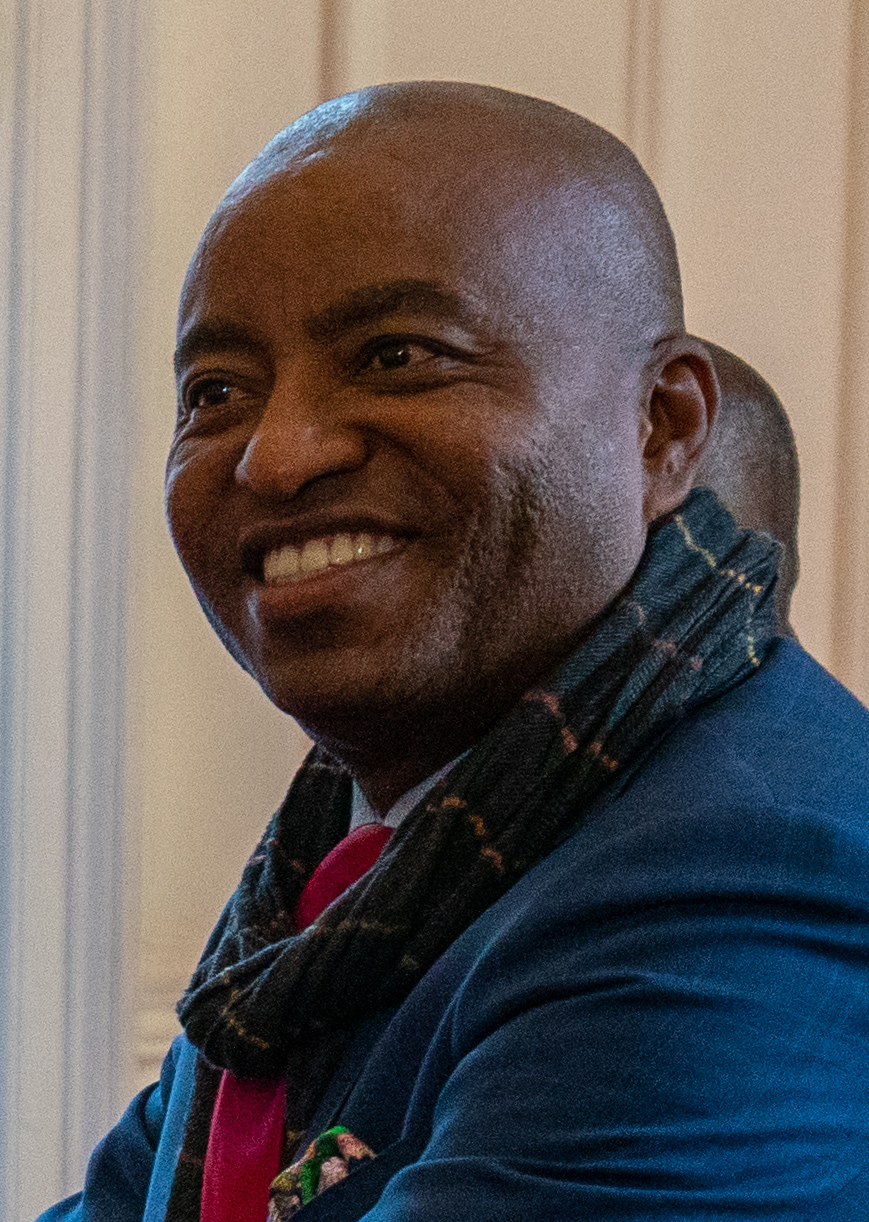
- Henfield in 2019

Minister of Foreign Affairs of The Bahamas
- In office 2017–2021
- Preceded by: Fred Mitchell
- Succeeded by: Fred Mitchell

Member of the Senate of the Bahamas
- In office 6 October 2021 – 19 May 2026

Personal details
- Party: Free National Movement

Darren Allan Henfield (born 16 April 1962) is a Bahamian politician from the Free National Movement (FNM). He last served as Senate minority leader in the Parliament of the Bahamas between 2021 and 2026. Previously, he served as Minister of Foreign Affairs of the Bahamas between 2017 and 2021. Before going into politics, Henfield retired from the Royal Bahamas Defence Force (RBDF) as (Acting) Lieutenant Commander on 3 January 2017 in order to accept the FNM’s nomination as its standards bearer in North Abaco.

== Early life and education ==
Darren A. Henfield is the eldest son of Bishop Clifford Henfield and Mother Evelyn Henfield of Dundas Town, Abaco. He graduated from the Abaco Central High School in 1979 and shortly thereafter began his military career as a RBDF marine recruit in 1981. He worked his way to the rank of petty officer before being selected to undergo the Special Duties Officers’ Course at Britannia Royal Naval College, Dartmouth, England in 1998, upon completion of which he was commissioned a sub-lieutenant.

During his near 36-year career in the military, he served in many billets and appointments at sea and ashore, including in operations, administration, headquarters and training. He served a commissioned officer in several billets aboard HMBS Nassau, performing the duties of Regulating Petty Officer in the Administration Department, and serving as a Training Instructor in the Training Department. Henfield also served as the Administration Staff Officer (S1) for the CARICOM battalion during the 2002 Exercise Tradewinds. One of his last appointments included being the Force Inspectorate Officer at Defence Force Headquarters. According to him, one of the highlights of his career was his six-month deployment as a CARICOM peacekeeper in the Republic of Haiti during 1995, under the aegis of United Nations mission to the country.

Henfield received a bachelor’s degree in Law from the University of the West Indies (College of The Bahamas Campus) in 2009 and was called to The Bahamas Bar as a council and attorney in 2011. He then served three years as a junior council in the Office of the Attorney-General. In 2014, he became the first Bahamian officer to attend the U.S. Naval Postgraduate School (NPS), in Monterey, California, where he received a master’s degree in Security Studies (Combating Terrorism: Policy and Strategy). His five-quarter academic program was funded by the U.S. International Military Education and Training (IMET) Program, through the U.S. Embassy in Nassau. His thesis, which is titled "Making the national security council 'better in the Bahamas' to resolve illegal migration", examines the perennial national security issues of The Bahamas and offers recommendations toward addressing illegal immigration from Haiti. Upon his graduation at NPS, he was presented with the Kiwanis Outstanding International Student Award for his academic standing, achievement and involvement in community affairs.

== Political career ==
Darren Henfield was elected to the House of Assembly for the North Abaco constituency on 10 May 2017, during the 2017 Bahamian general election. Six days later, on 16 May, he was appointed Minister of Foreign Affairs. During his tenure as Minister, Henfield faced unprecedented challenges such as hurricanes Irma and Dorian, as well as the COVID-19 pandemic.

Henfield's foreign policy was marked by his climate change activism. During a United Nations High Level Meeting on the Impact of Hurricane Irma, Minister Henfield stated that climate change "casts a long shadow over [Bahamian] development efforts" and that "the implications of rising sea levels and atmospheric temperatures signal dire consequences for low-lying island states like The Bahamas". While delivering the national statement on the occasion of the 72nd Session of the General Assembly of the United Nations, Minister Henfield called on the "international community to recognize the imperative of accelerating the efforts to deal urgently with the adverse impact of climate change". In 2019, he played a key role in his government's relief efforts following the devastation caused by Hurricane Dorian. As senator, Henfield voiced his frustration over the lack of progress in his hometown, criticizing the Davis administration for its slow recovery efforts in Abaco and Grand Bahama following Hurricane Dorian.

During the COVID-19 pandemic, Minister Henfield procured vaccines internationally for local use and assisted Bahamians stranded abroad. In 2020, while serving as the President of the 50th Regular Session of the General Assembly of the Organization of American States, which he deemed "the premier political forum" of the Western Hemisphere, he mentioned that the COVID-19 pandemic exposed the need to "food security, availability and accessibility at all times". By 2021, and thanks to the government's actions, he noted a "strong resurgence" in the "tourism sector through unique opportunities like homeporting" and that the country's hotel industry was "reporting relatively high occupancies and longer stays".

While Minister of Foreign Affairs, Henfield "highlighted the long history of close relations between The Bahamas and the US, which goes beyond political and economic ties to include shared cultural and familial connections". Regionally, Henfield also worked toward preserving democracy in Venezuela and Nicaragua. He has been a promoter of South-South cooperation and stands against the U.S. embargo against Cuba. On a general note, he believes that "women should be included in all acts of decision making" and that "there should be gender parity in policy making", in addition to working toward the elimination of violence against women.

In 2021, Henfield lost his North Abaco seat to the Progressive Liberal Party politician Kirk Cornish. Shortly thereafter, Henfield was appointed to the Senate of the Bahamas, where he also served as Senate minority leader. During the 2026 Bahamian general election, Henfield ran for the Congress for the constituency of South Beach, but lost to the PLP candidate Bacchus Rolle.

== Personal life ==
Henfield is a Christian. He was appointed Senior Associate Pastor in 2012 in the Calvary Deliverance Church. While there, he chaired the church’s Annual Convention Committee for more 12 years, and also served as chairman of the Building Fund Committee, which greatly assisted with the church’s ambitious refurbishment and renovations project during 2003. Notwithstanding his own beliefs, Henfield is a defender of freedom of religion or belief, which are enshrined in the Constitution of The Bahamas.

Darren Henfield is married to Deidre (nee Edgecombe) of Sandy Point, Abaco. They have three sons (Darren, Dasheiko and Dreyon) and two granddaughters (Dahlya and Darielle).
