= Clint Watson =

Bahamian politician

The Honourable Clint Watson Senator

Member of the Senate of the Bahamas
- Incumbent
- Assumed office 19 May 2026

Personal details
- Party: Progressive Liberal Party

Clint Watson is a Bahamian politician from the Progressive Liberal Party (PLP).

== Career ==
Watson is a journalist who served as Press Secretary in the Office of the Prime Minister. He was appointed general manager of the Broadcasting Corporation of The Bahamas in 2023. He was succeeded by Opal Roach

Watson was reported as a potential candidate for Southern Shores. Following the 2026 Bahamian general election, he was appointed to the Senate for the government. He was appointed Parliamentary Secretary in the Office of the Prime Minister by Philip Davis.

== See also ==
- 15th Bahamian Parliament
