= Obie Roberts =

Bahamian politician

Member of Parliament for Southern Shores
- Incumbent
- Assumed office 12 May 2026
- Preceded by: Leroy Major

Personal details
- Party: Progressive Liberal Party
- Parent: Bradley Roberts (father)

S. Obie Roberts is a Bahamian politician from the Progressive Liberal Party (PLP). He was elected member of the House of Assembly for Southern Shores in 2026. He is deputy chairman of the PLP. He is the son of former cabinet minister Bradley Roberts.

== See also ==
- 15th Bahamian Parliament
