= Bradley Roberts (Bahamian politician) =

Bahamian politician (1943–2018)

Member of Parliament for Bains Town and Grants Town
- In office 1982–2007
- Preceded by: constituency established
- Succeeded by: Bernard Nottage

Personal details
- Born: 25 December 1943 New Providence, Bahamas
- Died: 25 October 2018 (aged 74)
- Party: Progressive Liberal Party
- Children: Obie Roberts
- Education: College of the Bahamas

Bradley Bernard Emmanuel Roberts (25 December 1943 – 25 October 2018) was a Bahamian politician from the Progressive Liberal Party (PLP). He served as member of parliament for Bain Town and Grants Town and as a cabinet minister.

== Early life ==
Roberts was born on New Providence on 25 December 1943. He was the great-grandson of Ernest Lenkard Bowen, who represented South New Providence in the House of Assembly from 1911 to 1925. Roberts attended St. Francis Primary School, St. Augustine's College, the Eastern Senior School and the College of the Bahamas.

== Political career ==
Roberts first contested a seat at the 1977 Bahamian general election in the Shirlea Constituency against Sir Roland Symonette. In the 1982 Bahamian general election he was elected to the House of Assembly for the new constituency of Bain Town and Grants Town on the island of New Providence. In office he was known affectionately as "Big Bad Brad". He served as Opposition Whip and Leader of Opposition Business in Parliament and was elected the National Chairman of the Progressive Liberal Party in 2000. On several occasions he served as acting Prime Minister.

In the 2002 Bahamian general election, he was appointed Minister of Works and Utilities by Perry Christie following the election victory. He stood down from parliament at the 2007 Bahamian general election. Roberts was Progressive Liberal Party chairman. In 2009, he stood again as candidate for party chairman. In May 2017, he said he would be stepping down as PLP chairman.

== Personal life ==
Roberts was a Roman Catholic. Roberts and his wife Hartlyn M. Mackey of Eleuthera had four children. His son Obie Roberts is PLP deputy chairman and contested Southern Shores at the 2026 Bahamian general election.

Roberts died suddenly at home in October 2018. On 7 November 2018, a memorial service was held at PLP where tributes were made by politicians including former Prime Minister Perry Christie, former Attorneys General Allyson Maynard Gibson and Alfred Sears, former minister Shane Gibson and former MP Franklyn Wilson. On 12 November 2018, his funeral was held at St. Francis Xavier Cathedral in Nassau.
