= Sea Breeze (Bahamas Parliament constituency) =

Bahamas parliamentary constituency

- Constituency
- Sea Breeze is 7 on this map of the 2021 election
- District: New Providence
- Electorate: 4,097 (2011); 5,704 (2021)

Current constituency
- Seats: 1
- Party: Progressive Liberal Party
- Member: Leslia Miller-Brice

Sea Breeze is a parliamentary constituency represented in the House of Assembly of The Bahamas. It elects one member of parliament (MP) using the first past the post electoral system. It has been represented by Leslia Miller-Brice from the Progressive Liberal Party since 2021.

== Geography ==
The constituency comprises an area on the south coast of New Providence, outside the city of Nassau, the capital and largest city of The Bahamas.

== Members of Parliament ==
Election	Parliament	Candidate	Party
2007	11th Bahamian Parliament	Carl Bethel	Free National Movement
2012	12th Bahamian Parliament	Hope Strachan	Progressive Liberal Party
2017	13th Bahamian Parliament	Lanisha T. Rolle	Free National Movement
2021	14th Bahamian Parliament	Leslia Miller-Brice	Progressive Liberal Party
2026	15th Bahamian Parliament	Leslia Miller-Brice	Progressive Liberal Party

== Election results ==
2021
Party	Candidate	Votes	%	±%
PLP	Leslia Miller-Brice	2,448	62.91	▲29.91
FNM	Maxine Seymour	1,090	28.01	▼29.99
COI	Ann Glinton-Rolle	276	7.09	
DNA	Sherrene A. Gibson-Harris	33	0.85	▼8.15
United Coalition Movement	Keva Brown	24	0.62	
Kingdom Government Movement	Derek Bullard	13	0.33	
Grand Commonwealth Party	Zina Smith	7	0.18	
Turnout		3,891	68.22	
PLP gain from FNM				

== See also ==
- Constituencies of The Bahamas
