= D'Asante Small =

Bahamian politician

The Honourable D'Asante Small Senator

Member of the Senate of the Bahamas
- Incumbent
- Assumed office December 9, 2025

Personal details
- Born: 1989 (age 36–37)
- Party: Progressive Liberal Party

D’Ansante Beneby Small (born 1989) is a Bahamian politician from the Progressive Liberal Party (PLP).

== Career ==
Small represented the Bahamas at the United Nations Commission on the Status of Women and chaired the Progressive Young Liberals. She is a member of the Alpha Kappa Alpha Sorority.

Small was appointed to the Senate of the Bahamas in December 2025. She was sworn in by Governor General Cynthia Pratt. Following the 2026 Bahamian general election, she was repointed to the Senate.

== See also ==
- 15th Bahamian Parliament
