= Shanendon Cartwright =

Bahamian politician

Member of the Parliament of the Bahamas for St. Barnabas
- In office 10 May 2017 – 8 April 2026
- Preceded by: constituency created
- Succeeded by: Michael Halkitis

Personal details
- Party: Free National Movement

Shanendon Eugene Cartwright is a Bahamian politician from the opposition Free National Movement (FNM). He was the member of parliament for St. Barnabas.

== Political career ==
He was first elected in the 2017 Bahamian general election. He was re-elected in the 2021 Bahamian general election. Cartwright was executive chairman of the Bahamas Public Parks and Beaches Authority. In 2022, he was elected deputy leader of the Free National Movement (FNM).

On 4 December 2024, Cartwright threw the parliamentary mace out of a window, after feeling Speaker Patricia Deveaux did not let him speak. This move paralleled an incident in 1965, when the leader of the opposition also threw the mace out of a window, pushing for political change, in an event since dubbed "Black Tuesday". It followed reports from US federal prosecutors that Bahamian officials were facilitating imports of cocaine into the United States in exchange for bribes. Members of the FNM were later forced out of the building by police. Cartwright was later released.

In the 2026 Bahamian general election, Cartwright was the FNM candidate in the new St James constituency. In the election, he lost to Owen C. B. Wells from the Progressive Liberal Party (PLP).
