= Kenneth Solomon (politician) =

Bahamian lawyer and politician

Sir Kenneth Solomon C.B.E., Q.C. (1884-1954) (frequently cited as A. K. Solomon) was a prominent Bahamian lawyer and politician. He built up a large legal practice before running for parliament in 1908. He was a Member of Parliament from 1908-1918 and again from 1925-1954. He was a magistrate from 1918-1921. He served briefly as acting Attorney-General and acting Chief Justice of the Bahamas. In addition, he was the Speaker of the House of Assembly from 1942-1946, a member of the Executive Council from 1926-1941, and president of the Legislative Council from 1946 until his death in 1954. In 1925, Solomon was appointed King's Counsel and in 1953, Solomon was knighted by the Queen.

== Early life and education ==
Aubrey Kenneth Solomon was born in 1884 in Harbour Island, Bahamas. The family moved to Nassau when Solomon was 10 and he attended Nassau Grammar School from 1894 to 1899. Solomon trained as a lawyer and was called to the Bahamas Bar in July 1905.

== Career ==
Solomon became a prominent lawyer with a large private practice. He collaborated frequently with top black lawyer, Alfred F. Adderley.

In 1908, he became a Member of Parliament when he won a bye-election to become the representative for Abaco. He held the seat until 1918. Solomon was appointed to be a stipendiary and circuit magistrate of the Bahamas in 1918. He served as a magistrate until 1921.

He served briefly as acting Attorney-General in 1916 and 1918 and from 1919 to 1920. He also served as acting Chief Justice from November 1920 to February 1921 but Solomon resigned after he failed to secure the substantive role of Attorney-General.

In 1925, Solomon won another bye-election, becoming the Member of Parliament for the southern district of New Providence. He was re-elected in 1928 and 1935. He served as legal adviser to the House of Assembly from 1923 to 1933. In 1937, he became the government leader in the House of Assembly. In 1939, he was serving as acting Colonial Secretary. In 1940, he was appointed chair of the Bahamas War Committee by the Governor responsible for raising funds for the war effort. In 1942, he was elected to the seat for the City District. Solomon served as MP until 1946.

Solomon was a member of the Executive Council from 1926 to 1941 and Speaker of the House of Assembly from 1942 to 1946. Solomon was appointed president of the Legislative Council in 1946; a position in which he served until his death. In 1948, he was appointed a commissioner for the revision and compilation of the colony's laws. In 1951, Solomon was appointed the chair of the committee to raise funds for a new hospital, which would become the Princess Margaret Hospital. In 1953, he represented the Bahamas branch of the Commonwealth Parliamentary Association at the coronation of Queen Elizabeth II.

== Honours and awards ==
In 1925, Solomon was appointed King's Counsel. In 1941, he was made a Commander of the Order of the British Empire in the King's New Year Honours of 1941. Solomon was knighted 12 years later by the Queen in 1953.

== Personal life and death ==
He married Mercedes Lofthouse, the daughter of merchant and member of parliament, Thomas H. C. Lofthouse, in 1914. His nephew was Stafford Sands.

Solomon died on 2 November 1954. He was 70.

The Colonial Office Report remarked "Solomon had a long record of public service to his credit and his passing left a gap which it will be difficult to fill." The government donated a tablet in Christ Church Cathedral in his honour and his wife donated a new pulpit to the church "in memory of Sir Aubrey Kenneth Solomon, chairman of the hospital fundraising committee".

== Works ==
- Solomon, Kenneth, ed. Law Report Volume 1, 1900-1906.
