= Trevor Johnson =

Trevor Johnson may refer to:

- Trevor Johnson (American football) (born 1981), American football defensive end
- Trevor Johnson (historian) (born 1929), British historian; see Robert W. Scribner
- Trevor Johnson (ice hockey) (born 1982), Canadian-born Italian ice hockey player
- Trevor Johnson (designer), English graphic designer
- Trevor Johnson (footballer) (1935–2016), former Australian rules football player
- Trevor Johnson (politician) (born 1996), Bahamian politician
- Trevor Johnson (curler) (born 1998), Canadian curler

== See also ==
- Trevor Johnston, Australian linguist
