= Barbara Cartwright =

Bahamian politician

The Honourable Barbara Cartwright Senator

Minister of Social Services
- Incumbent
- Assumed office 17 May 2026
- Prime Minister: Philip Davis
- Preceded by: office established

Member of the Senate of the Bahamas
- Incumbent
- Assumed office May 2026

Personal details
- Party: Progressive Liberal Party

Barbara Lynn Cartwright is a Bahamian politician from the Progressive Liberal Party (PLP).

== Career ==
Cartwright served as Chairperson of the Board at the Bahamas Mortgage Corporation. She was the PLP secretary general. Following the 2026 Bahamian general election, she was sworn into the Senate and appointed to the Cabinet of the Bahamas as Minister of Social Services. In June 2026, she led the Bahamas delegation at the OAS Inter-American Commission of Women Assembly.

== See also ==
- 15th Bahamian Parliament
