= Latrae Rahming =

Bahamian politician

The Honourable Latrae Rahming Senator

Member of the Senate of the Bahamas
- Incumbent
- Assumed office 19 May 2026

Personal details
- Party: Progressive Liberal Party

Latrae Rahming is a Bahamian politician from the Progressive Liberal Party (PLP).

== Career ==
In September 2021, Rahming was appointed Director of Communications at the Office of the Prime Minister. Following the 2026 Bahamian general election, he was appointed to the Senate for the government.

== See also ==
- 15th Bahamian Parliament
