= JoBeth =

JoBeth is a given name. Notable people with the name include:

- JoBeth Coleby-Davis (born 1984), Bahamian politician
- JoBeth Williams (born 1948), American actress and director

== See also ==
- Jo Beth Taylor (born 1971), Australian television presenter, actress and singer
