= Kevin Simmons =

Bahamian politician

The Honourable Kevin Simmons Senator

Member of the Senate of the Bahamas
- Incumbent
- Assumed office 19 May 2026

Personal details
- Party: Progressive Liberal Party

Kevin Simmons is a Bahamian politician from the Progressive Liberal Party (PLP).

== Career ==
Simmons previously served as Chairman of the Straw Market Authority. Following the 2026 Bahamian general election, he was appointed to the Senate for the government.

== See also ==
- 15th Bahamian Parliament
