= Colonial Secretary =

Colonial Secretary may refer to:

== In Great Britain ==
- Secretary of State for the Colonies, the British Cabinet minister who headed the Colonial Office, commonly known as Colonial Secretary, a position created in 1768

== In the colonies ==
- Chief secretary (British Empire), also known as colonial secretary, the official in many British colonies who headed the day-to-day functions of the colony's government, deputy to the governor, including:

=== Australia ===
- Colonial Secretary of New South Wales from 1821 to 1959 when the role was renamed to Chief Secretary
- Colonial Secretary of South Australia, from 1836 to 1856 when the role was renamed to Chief Secretary
- Colonial Secretary of Tasmania, from 1856 to 1873, previously Colonial Secretary of Van Diemen's Land from 1826 to 1856
- Colonial Secretary of Western Australia, from 1828 to 1924

=== Other colonies ===
- Chief Secretary (Hong Kong), renamed from the Colonial Secretary in 1976
- Chief Secretary, Singapore, renamed from the Colonial Secretary in 1955
- Colonial Secretary of Ceylon, one of six offices that held a seat in the Executive Council of Ceylon
- Colonial Secretary (New Zealand), the chief administrator of New Zealand from 1840 to 1907
- Colonial Secretary of the Bahamas, second highest official in the colony, usually appointed from Britain.

== See also ==
- Provincial secretary, a senior in the executive councils in North American colonial governments
