= Ryan Pinder =

Bahamian politician

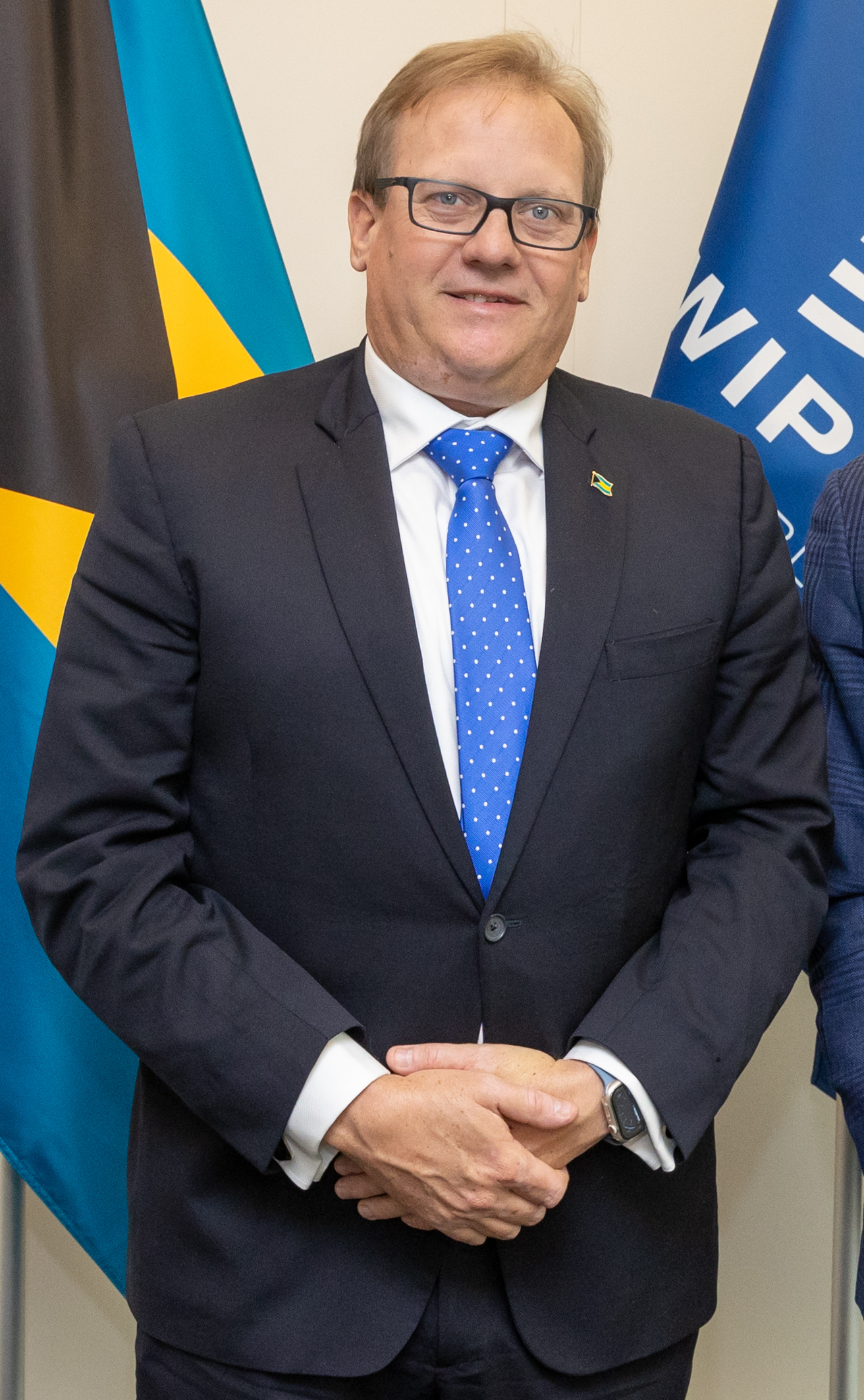
- At a WIPO meeting in 2023

Minister for Legal Affairs and Attorney-General
- Incumbent
- Assumed office September 2021
- Preceded by: Carl Bethel

Senator
- Incumbent
- Assumed office September 2021

Minister of Financial Services
- In office May 2012 – December 2014
- Prime Minister: Perry Christie
- Succeeded by: Hope Strachan

Member of Parliament for Elizabeth
- In office April 2010 – May 2017
- Preceded by: Malcolm Adderley
- Succeeded by: Duane Sands

Personal details
- Born: Leo Ryan Pinder; 13 September 1973 (age 53) Nassau, Bahamas
- Party: Progressive Liberal Party
- Spouse: Melissa Calvin Pinder
- Children: 2
- Education: University of Miami; Eugene Dupuch Law School

Leo Ryan Pinder (born 13 September 1974) is a Bahamian lawyer and politician. He has served as Attorney-General and Minister of Legal Affairs and a Senator since September 2021. He was previously the Member of Parliament for the Elizabeth constituency from 2010 to 2017.

== Early life and education ==
Pinder was born at the Rassin Hospital (now Doctor's Hospital) in Downtown Nassau to Marvin and Nancy Pinder. His paternal family has been in the Bahamas over 300 years, and his father was an MP in the Pindling government.

Pinder attended Queen's College and St Andrew's School locally before attending The Stony Brook School in Stony Brook, New York for high school. He then attended the University of Miami, where he graduated with a Bachelor and then a Master of Business Administration from the university's business school and then a JD and Master of Laws from the law school.

== Career ==
Pinder was called to the Florida Bar in 2000 and practiced law in the United States for a number of years before returning to Nassau where he took a six-month course at the Eugene Dupuch Law School. A U.S. citizen by descent through his mother, he renounced U.S. citizenship in February 2010.

=== Political career ===
In 2009, Pinder was elected vice-chairman of the Progressive Liberal Party and co-chairman of the party's Committee of Foreign Affairs. The following year, he won a parliamentary by-election for the Elizabeth constituency triggered by Malcolm Adderley's resignation. At the time of his election, Pinder was the youngest PLP MP and one of only two MPs born after independence. He sat on the Committee of Public Accounts.

After being reelected in the 2012 general election, Pinder served as the Minister of Financial Services until his resignation in December 2014. He was succeeded by Hope Strachan. Following that, he spent a year with Deltec, a private bank, and then in 2015 joined the law firm of Graham, Thompson & Co as a partner. He stood down at the 2017 general election.

When the PLP defeated the FNM in September 2021, Pinder was appointed Senator by Prime Minister Philip Davis and to the Office of the Attorney-General and Ministry of Legal Affairs.

== Personal ==
Pinder is married to Ellissa McCombe. Pinder has two children, Leo Austin Pinder and Olivia Pinder.
