= John Pinder II =

Bahamian politician

Member of the Parliament of the Bahamas for Central and South Abaco
- In office September 2021 – May 2026
- Preceded by: James Albury
- Succeeded by: Bradley R. Fox

Personal details
- Party: Progressive Liberal Party

John H. W. Pinder II is a Bahamian politician from the Progressive Liberal Party.

== Early life ==
Pinder is a direct descendant of the first settlers of Hope Town and Cherokee Sound on the Abaco Islands.

== Career ==
In the 2021 Bahamian general election, he was elected in Central and South Abaco.

On 23 September 2021, he was appointed Parliamentary Secretary to the Ministry of Tourism, Investments & Aviation.

== See also ==
- 14th Bahamian Parliament
