= Wayne Munroe =

Bahamian lawyer

The Honourable Wayne Munroe

Minister of National Security
- Incumbent
- Assumed office 20 September 2021
- Prime Minister: Philip Davis
- Preceded by: Marvin Dames

Member of Parliament for Freetown
- In office September 2021 – May 2026
- Preceded by: Dionisio D'Aguilar
- Succeeded by: Lincoln Deal

Personal details
- Born: 1 March 1968 (age 58)
- Party: Progressive Liberal Party

Wayne R. Munroe KC is a Bahamian politician and lawyer. He is immediate past President of the Bahamas Bar Association.

== Biography ==
Munroe is the Principal in the firm of Munroe & Associates, and was admitted to the Bar of England and Wales by the Honourable Society of the Inner Temple on 26 July 1990, and to the Bar of the Commonwealth of The Bahamas on 24 August 1990.

He is most famous outside of the Bahamas for his representation of Anna Nicole Smith.

He was appointed Queen's Counsel in January 2015.

In the 2021 Bahamian general election, he was elected in Freetown constituency. In September 2021, he was appointed as the Minister of National Security in Bahamas government during a ceremony held in the Andros Room of the Baha Mar Resort in New Providence.

Munroe stood at the 2026 Bahamian general election. He was unseated by Lincoln Deal from the Free National Movement (FNM).
