= Frazette Gibson =

Bahamian politician

Member of Parliament for Central Grand Bahama
- Incumbent
- Assumed office 12 May 2026
- Preceded by: Iram Lewis

Personal details
- Party: Free National Movement
- Education: University of The Bahamas

Frazette Gibson is a Bahamian politician from the Free National Movement (FNM). She was elected member of the House of Assembly for Central Grand Bahama in 2026. She was one of nine women who were elected.

== Biography ==
Gibson was born in the settlement of Hunters, Grand Bahama, as the daughter of Bernadette McIntosh and Frazar Bullard. Gibson earned her bachelor’s degree in history and geography from the University of The Bahamas, where she was elected president of the College of The Bahamas Union of Students (COBUS).

Gibson was Chief Councillor for the City of Freeport Council. She is a school administrator and local government councillor. In 2024, she became chair of the Commonwealth Women in Local Government Network. In January 2026, she was selected to replace Iram Lewis as the FNM candidate for Central Grand Bahama. She was elected in the 2026 Bahamian general election.

== See also ==
- 15th Bahamian Parliament
