= Vianna Gardiner =

Bahamian politician

Member of the Senate of the Bahamas
- In office 6 October 2021 – December 31, 2021

Personal details
- Party: Free National Movement

Viana Gardiner is a Bahamian politician from the Free National Movement who briefly served as a member of the Senate of the Bahamas. She resigned at the end of 2021 and she was replaced by Michaela Barnett-Ellis in February 2022.

Gardiner is Senior Vice President of Legal Affairs at the Atlantis resort.
