= Bahamas Ministry of Tourism and Aviation =

The Bahamas Ministry of Tourism, Investment and Aviation is a government agency of The Bahamas. Its head office is at the Bolam House in Nassau. The agency has other offices in New Providence and other islands. The current minister for this department is The Hon. Isaac Chester Cooper. The Bahamian tourism began during the 19th century and continued to develop before becoming the biggest industry in The Bahamas.

== History of tourism in The Bahamas ==
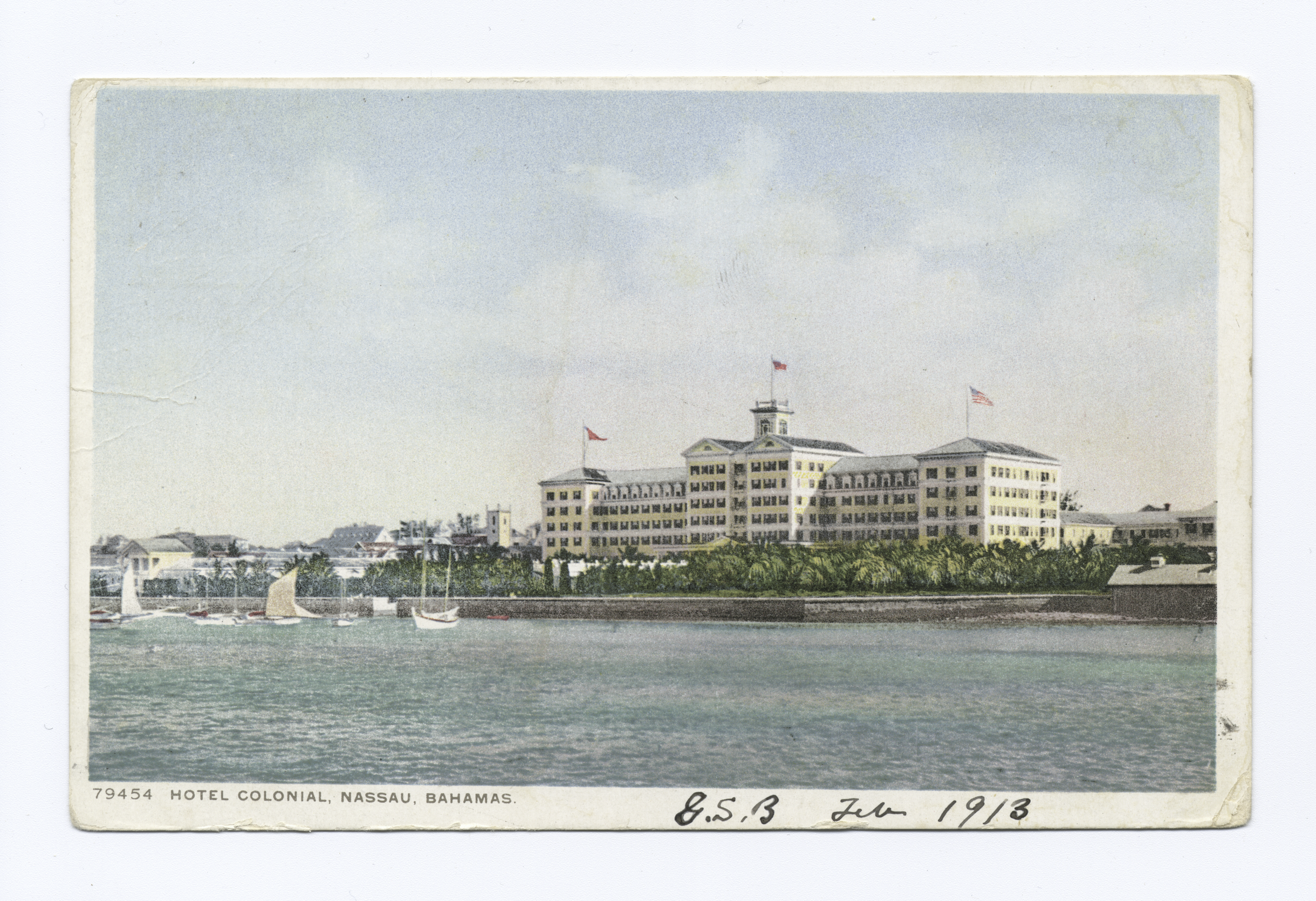
The Hotel Colonial

The Bahamian tourism industry began during the 19th century when the government wanted to build a hotel and steamship service. In 1851, any person or company who provided a steamship service between Nassau and New York was paid £3,000 annually for 5 years. In 1961, the Royal Victoria Hotel was built with the goal of appealing to winter visitors. However, the American Civil War caused it to become a home to blockade-runners. The Hotel Colonial opened in Nassau in 1900 and in 1913 the Manufacturers and Hotel Encouragement Act was created to bring in more materials for building hotels without duties. The Lucerne Hotel also opened the same year.

In 1914, the Development Board was created with an office in Nassau and members were responsible for promoting tourism through advertisements, information services and public relations with a budget of £3,000 annually. In 1915-1916, World War I caused steamships to cancel services to the Bahamas leaving hotels with no guests and subsequently leading to closure of the Royal Victoria Hotel and the Hotel Colonial.

In 1919, the colony was able to find stability again with the passing of the Volstead Act in the United States. Many Bahamians were able to make money importing and exporting alcohol to US ports. The Royal Victoria Hotel was able to reopen because of bootleggers and wealthy American visitors. In 1920, casinos opened in The Bahamas and more hotels were completed such as the Rozelda Hotel and Montagu Hotel. The Pan American World Airways began services to New Providence in 1929, in 1934 the first aircraft landed in New Providence and the Oakes Field Airport was opened in 1939.

=== The Influence of Bede Clifford on Tourism ===
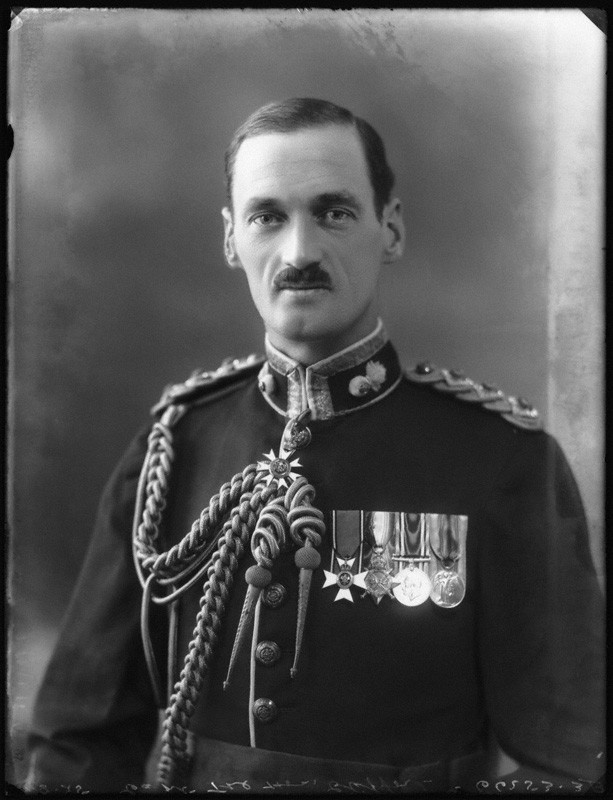
Sir Bede Clifford

Sir Bede Clifford became dedicated to developing the tourism industry when he became governor in 1932. Governor Clifford worked with the Development Board to create a policy that would encourage wealthy tourists to come to The Bahamas. He upgraded transportation, accommodations, and entertainment for those visiting The Bahamas. He did this by linking government, transportation and hotel operations through joint government. Telephones were installed in the New Colonial Hotel (previously known as the Hotel Colonial) as well as the Fort Montagu Hotel. Governor Clifford reported that the hotels were full to capacity by 1935.

New contracts for more steamship services to come to Nassau were also established. A pier was built for liners as well as better facilities for seaplanes. A direct telephone line connecting Nassau to New York and Canada. Governor Clifford also improved the sports industry in The Bahamas which not only gained the interest of Bahamians but also tourists. The Silver Slipper and the Zanzibar, which were nightclubs, were built in the 1930s as a place of entertainment for tourists.

In the 1940s, Nassau was advertised as the Riviera of the western hemisphere and most hotels operated for three months out of the year. When the United States joined World War II in 1941, they, along with the British government, planned to use The Bahamas as air bases. They planned to improve the Oakes Field Airport in New Providence and build another airport on the western side of the island.

=== Political Influence on Tourism ===
After the 1949 General Election, members of the Legislature provide funds to promote tourism and the tourism budget increased by 66%. Stafford Sands, who was a lawyer and politician, became the chairman of the Development Board and successfully made The Bahamas into a year-round destination. In the 1950s, travel was made more affordable encouraging the middle class to engage in tourism. Hotels became air-conditioned to make year-round tourism more possible.

In 1952, The Bahamas Hotel Association to help the Development Board advertise hotels. Stafford Sands appointed the Development Board with the main job of promoting tourism. The Development Board used the Royal Bahamas Police Force Band and other local artists as entertainment for visitors and as a marketing strategy.

In 1953, the first successful political party in The Bahamas, the Progressive Liberal Party (PLP), was formed to ensure representation for all Bahamians. In 1964, The Bahamas form of governance became ministerial. Stafford Sands became both the Minister of Tourism and the Minister of Finance. By 1966, The Bahamas became the leader of tourism and the United States shifted tourism away from Cuba to The Bahamas. During this period, Stafford Sands introduced the Bahamian dollar which was fixed to the US dollar to avoid conversion rates.

The success of tourism in The Bahamas allowed for the improvement of harbors, medical facilities and infrastructure in the country. In 1958, the United Bahamian Party (UBP) was formed to represent the white group in The Bahamas. Despite the PLP winning the popular vote in the 1962 election, the UBP were still in the seat of government. The PLP politicians protested outside the House of Assembly in 1965. In the House, Milo Butler and Arthur Hanna spoke longer than the time they were allowed which led Roland Symonette to beg Bahamians not to disturb the peace.

The protests stopped on a day known as Black Tuesday when Sir. Lynden Pindling, leader of the PLP at the time, threw the mace out the window of the House of Assembly. Milo Butler also followed and threw the hourglass out the window. The PLP then left the House and joined the crowd. The next general election resulted in a tie between the PLP and UBP with an Independent Party and a Labor Party getting one seat each. Randol Fawkes, leader of the Labor Party at the time, was persuaded by the PLP to join them giving them majority.

Sir Lynden Pindling became the first black Premier of The Bahamas and appointed himself the Minister of Tourism after seeing how important tourism was to the country. The tourism industry went through a difficult period during the 1970s. To solve this problem, Pindling created a motto that said "Look Up, Move Up, The World is Watching" to encourage Bahamians to take pride in their work.

=== Development of Tourist Attractions ===
In 1969, Arthur Foulkes became the Minister of Tourism. During his time as Minister, he employed many Bahamians and expanded the number of representatives on the Tourism Advisory Board. in this ministry In 1971, Goombay Summer was introduced to expose Bahamian culture to tourists. It went on for 13 weeks in New Providence and Grand Bahama, highlighting traditional Bahamian dance and music, food, fashion and art. Goombay Summer was a successful attempt at bringing more tourists into the country during the summer months but officially stopped in 1992. In 1976, the National Tourism Achievement Awards (NTAA) recognized The Bahamas for the country's excellence in tourism related careers. This continued until 1991 and was replaced by the Cacique Awards in 1995.

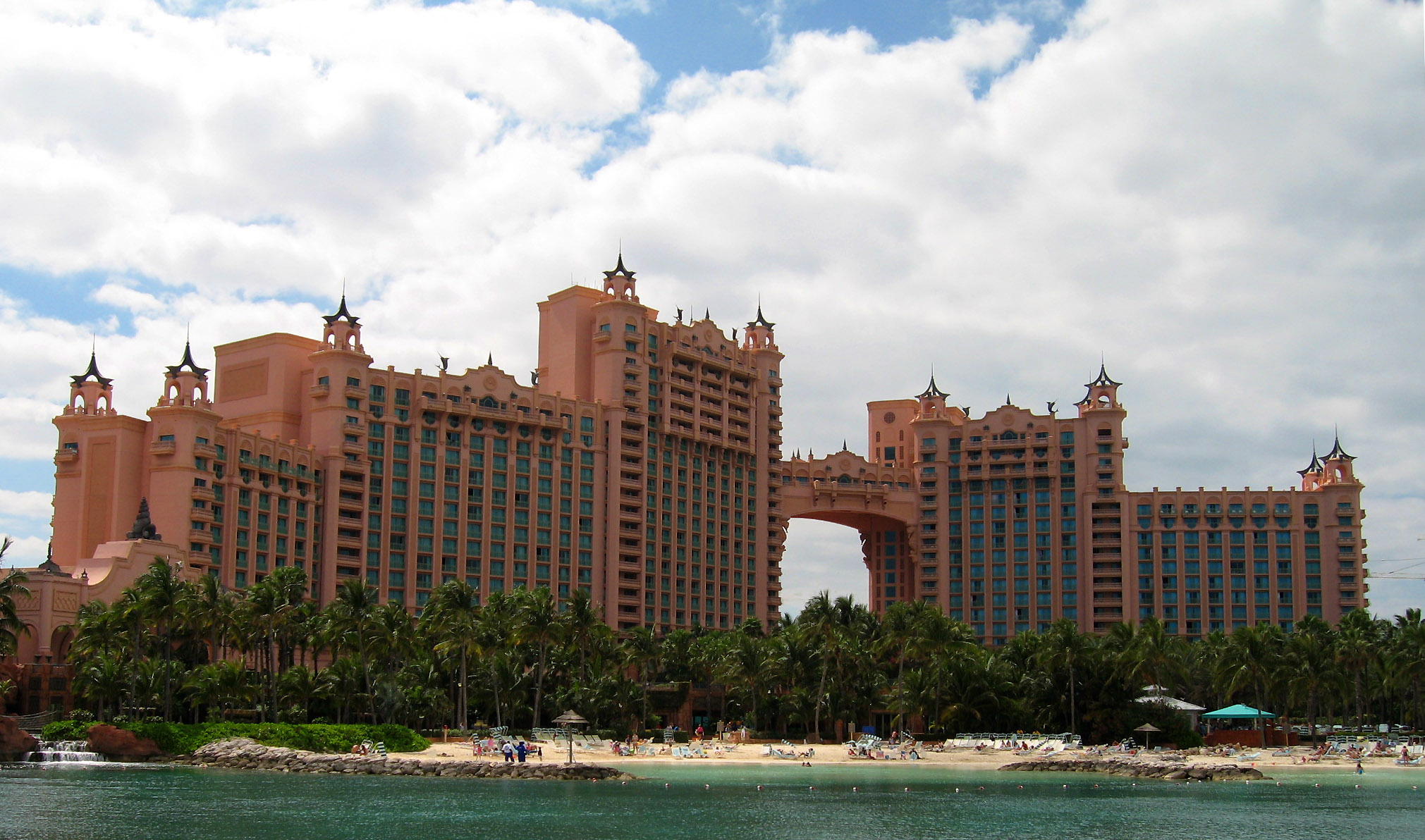
Atlantis Paradise Island

In the 1980s, tourism became the largest industry in the world and the budget for this ministry was increased in The Bahamas. In the 1990s, the Ministry of Tourism focused on refurbishing hotels and improving the appearance of New Providence. Improvements were made to Prince George Wharf, which was the site of cruise ships in Nassau, the Nassau International Airport (now the Lynden Pindling International Airport), and Arawak Cay. The government was able to reach an agreement with Sol Kerzner to develop the Atlantis resort on Paradise Island, New Providence. The development of the resort continued until 2007. The resort has over 3,000 rooms, a dolphin habitat and education center, and waterpark.

Baha Mar, a more recent hotel in The Bahamas, opened in 2017. It is the largest resort, casino and retail complex in the Caribbean. The resort consists of three hotels, the Grand Hyatt, the SLS and the Rosewood. It offers over 2,000 rooms, suites and villas, and more than 40 restaurants, bars and lounges. It also has beachfront property, spas, a Performance Arts and Convention Center, a racquet club, a waterpark, and a golf course designed by Jack Nicklaus.

Today, tourism remains the most important industry in The Bahamas and the Ministry of Tourism has the highest budget allocation among all Bahamian government ministries. The tourism industry directly and indirectly employs about 50% of Bahamians and contributes to over 70% of the country's GDP.

== Areas of responsibility ==
The areas that the Bahamas Ministry of Tourism, Investments and Aviation is responsible for include:

- Promoting and developing the Tourism industry
- Developing relationships with airports and airport authorities
- Managing lotteries and gaming
- Developing relationships with the Hotel Corporation of The Bahamas
- Promoting and overseeing the processing of investments
- Managing air transportation

== Ministers of Tourism ==
- Sir Stafford Sands: 1964
- Hon. Lynden O. Pindling: 1967; 1990
- Hon. Arthur Foulkes: 1968
- Hon. Clement T. Maynard: 1969; 1984
- Hon. Livingstone N. Coakley: 1979
- Hon. Perry Christie: 1982
- Hon. Brent Symonette: 1992
- Hon. Frank H. Watson: 1995
- Sir Cornelius A. Smith: 1997
- Obediah "Obie" Wilchcombe: 2002; 2017
- Glenys Hanna Martin: 2012
- Dionisio D'Aguilar: 2016
- Hon. I. Chester Cooper: 2021
