= Leroy Major =

Bahamian politician

Member of the Parliament of the Bahamas for Southern Shores
- In office 2021–2026
- Preceded by: Frankie Campbell
- Succeeded by: Obie Roberts

Personal details
- Party: Independent (since 2026)
- Other political affiliations: Progressive Liberal Party (until 2026)

Leroy Major is a Bahamian politician.

== Career ==
In the 2021 Bahamian general election, he was elected in Southern Shores for the Progressive Liberal Party.

He was appointed executive chairman of the Bahamas Agricultural and Industrial Corporation (BAIC). In 2024, he resigned from his post as Executive Chairman of The Bahamas Agricultural and Industrial Corporation (BAIC) and joined the Ministry of Agriculture as a consultant.

Major stood in the 2026 Bahamian general election as an independent candidate.

== See also ==
- 14th Bahamian Parliament
