= Freetown (Bahamas Parliament constituency) =

- Constituency
- Freetown is number 21 on the map
- District: New Providence
- Population: 12,943
- Electorate: 4,869
- Area: 11.26 km²

Current constituency
- Seats: 1
- Party: Progressive Liberal Party
- Member: Wayne Munroe

Freetown (previously Montagu) is a parliamentary constituency represented in the House of Assembly of the Bahamas. It is located in the eastern part of the island of New Providence. The current Member of Parliament (MP) is Wayne Munroe.

== Members of Parliament ==
Election	Member	Party
1992	William C. Allen	Free National
2002	Brent Symonette	Free National
2007	Loretta Butler-Turner	Free National
2012	Richard Lightbourne	Free National
Constituency renamed Freetown
2017	Dionisio D'Aguilar	Free National
2021	Wayne Munroe	Progressive Liberal
2026	Lincoln Deal	Free National

== Election results ==
2021
Party	Candidate	Votes	%	±%
PLP	Wayne Munroe	1,629	52.75	▲18.75
FNM	Dionisio D'Aguilar	1,220	39.51	▼20.49
COI	Patrice Hanna-Carey	199	6.44	
United Coalition Movement	Shammine Lindsay	27	0.87	
Grand Commonwealth Party	Shamicka Dean	13	0.42	
Turnout		3,088	63.42	
PLP gain from FNM				

== See also ==
- Constituencies of the Bahamas
