= Duane Sands =

Bahamian politician

Member of the Parliament of the Bahamas for Elizabeth
- In office 10 May 2017 – 16 September 2021
- Preceded by: Ryan Pinder
- Succeeded by: JoBeth Coleby-Davis

Personal details
- Born: 1962 (age 63–64) Nassau, Bahamas
- Party: Free National Movement
- Education: Cheshire Academy; Tufts University; Johns Hopkins School of Medicine
- Website: Official website

Duane E. Sands (born 1962) is a Bahamian politician from the Free National Movement (FNM) who serves as party chairman. He served as the Member of Parliament for the Elizabeth constituency from 2017 to 2021.

== Early life ==
Sands was born in Nassau to Basil and Roberta Sands. He was educated at St. Anne's High School in Nassau, Cheshire Academy in Connecticut and Tufts University in Massachusetts where he earned a Bachelor of Science Degree in Chemistry.

== Medical career ==
Sands is a cardiothoracic and vascular surgeon.

== Political career ==
Sands first entered politics during the 2010 Elizabeth by-election. In the 2017 Bahamian general election, Sands was elected MP for Elizabeth. Sands served as Minister of Health under Hubert Minnis. He served at the beginning of the COVID-19 pandemic.

In the 2021 Bahamian general election, he was unseated by JoBeth Coleby-Davis from the Progressive Liberal Party (PLP). He served as chairman of the FNM. Sands was the FNM candidate for Bamboo Town at the 2026 Bahamian general election. He lost in the election to Patricia Deveaux. After the election he was responsible for election post-mortem.

== Political views ==
Sands supports the use of capital punishment.

== Personal life ==
Sands is Anglican.

== See also ==
- 13th Bahamian Parliament
