= Central Grand Bahama (Bahamas Parliament constituency) =

Bahamas parliamentary constituency

- Constituency
- Central Grand Bahama in the 2021 election
- District: Grand Bahama

Current constituency
- Seats: 1
- Party: Free National Movement
- Member: Frazette Gibson

Central Grand Bahama is a parliamentary constituency represented in the House of Assembly of the Bahamas. It elects one member of parliament (MP) using the First past the post electoral system. It has been represented by Frazette Gibson from the Free National Movement since 2026. More information can be found on the constituency website www.centralgrandbahama.org.

== Geography ==
The constituency comprises the central areas of the island of Grand Bahama.

== Demographics ==
4,119 registered voters in 2011.

== Members of Parliament ==
Election	Parliament	Candidate	Party
2012	12th Bahamian Parliament	Neko Grant	Free National Movement
2017	13th Bahamian Parliament	Iram Lewis	Free National Movement
2021	14th Bahamian Parliament	Iram Lewis	Free National Movement
2026	15th Bahamian Parliament	Frazette Gibson	Free National Movement

== Election results ==
2021
Party	Candidate	Votes	%	±%
FNM	Iram Lewis	2,091	48.02	▼16.98
PLP	Kirkland Russell	1,760	40.42	▲9.42
COI	Latanya Ferguson-Sanchez	416	9.55	
United Coalition Movement	Troy Garvey	47	1.08	
Kingdom Government Movement	Rollington Cooper Jr.	40	0.92	
Turnout		4,354	63.94	
FNM hold				

== See also ==
- Constituencies of the Bahamas
