= Lincoln Deal =

Bahamian politician

Member of Parliament for Freetown
- Incumbent
- Assumed office 12 May 2026
- Preceded by: Wayne Munroe

Personal details
- Party: Free National Movement

Lincoln Deal II is a Bahamian politician from the Free National Movement (FNM). He was elected member of the House of Assembly for Freetown in 2026.

== See also ==
- 15th Bahamian Parliament
