= Sherry Tross =

Kittitian diplomat

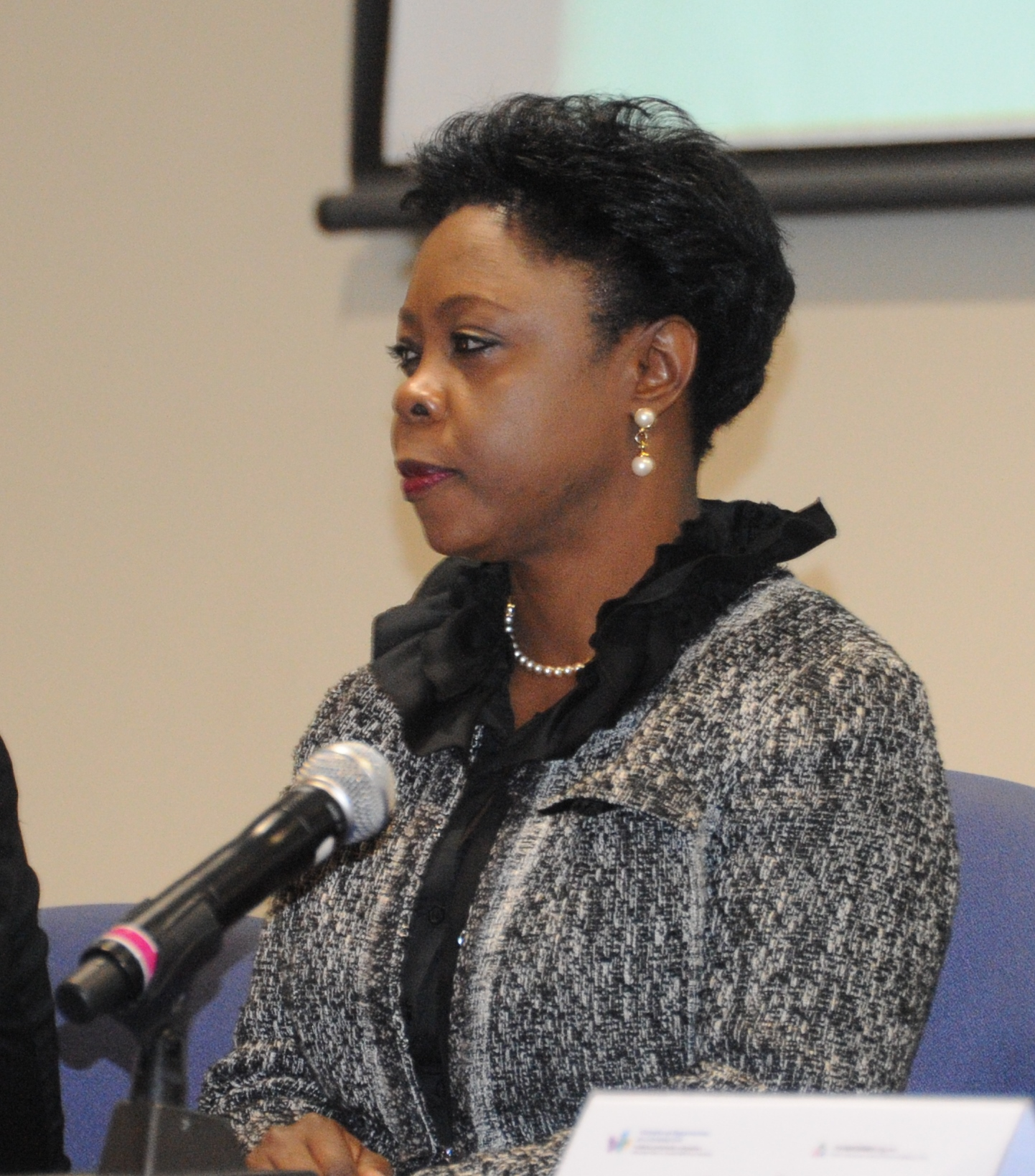
- Tross in 2012
- Born: Nevis, Saint Kitts and Nevis
- Education: Hamilton College, New York; University of Miami
- Occupation: Diplomat

Vaughna Sherry Tross is a diplomat from Saint Kitts and Nevis.

== Education ==
Tross is Nevisian. She holds a degree in Spanish from Hamilton College, New York and a Master's degree in International Relations from the University of Miami.

== Career ==
She served as head of the Organization of American States (OAS) Secretariat for Integral Development and Director General of the Inter-American Agency for Cooperation and Development. She was the first woman in the history of the organization to hold both positions. She has also worked at the World Trade Center in Miami and the University of Miami's North South Center.

In 2018, Tross was appointed High Commissioner to Canada. In 2022, she was appointed ambassador to Panama. She serves in both positions out of Ottawa.

Tross was awarded the United Nations South-South Cooperation Award and the Women in Leadership award from the Inter-American Commission of Women. In 2012, the government of Chile conferred on her the Order of Bernardo O'Higgins.

On 20 April 2026, the Organization of American States designated Sherry Tross as chief of mission for election monitoring at the 2026 Bahamian general election.
