= Coral Harbour, The Bahamas =

Town in Bahamas

Coral Harbour
- Town
- Location within Bahamas
- Coordinates: 24.9975°N 77.45778°W
- Country: Bahamas
- Island: New Providence
- Time zone: UTC-5 (Eastern Time Zone)
- Area code: 242

Coral Harbour is a town in the Bahamas.

== Geography ==
Coral Harbour is located on west coast of the island of New Providence. There is a Royal Bahamas Defence Force bas located at Coral Harbour.

== Governance ==
For elections to the Parliament of the Bahamas, Coral Harbour is part of the St James constituency.
