= Adelaide, Bahamas =

Human settlement in Bahamas

Adelaide
- Town
- Location within Bahamas
- Coordinates: 24.98333°N 77.48333°W
- Country: Bahamas
- Island: New Providence
- Time zone: UTC-5 (Eastern Time Zone)
- Area code: 242

Adelaide or Adelaide Village is a populated place in southwest New Providence island, Bahamas.

== History ==
Adelaide was founded in 1831 by Sir James Carmichael-Smyth as one of a number of settlements intended for freed slaves. The community of Adelaide Village was set up by the British Crown centred around a church built for and by freed slaves.

St James Anglican Church, the only congregation in Adelaide, was attached to the new parish. The church was consecrated in 1849. A primary school later opened in the village. In 1926, the church and schoolhouse were destroyed in a hurricane. They were subsequently restored. Both were rebuilt again in 1948.

Just north of Adelaide Gardens is the sight of the Windsor Lakes (formerly Adelaide Pines) development.

== Governance ==
For elections to the Parliament of the Bahamas, Adelaide is part of the St James constituency.
