= Keno Wong =

Bahamian politician

The Honourable Keno Wong Senator

Member of the Senate of the Bahamas
- Incumbent
- Assumed office 19 May 2026
- Monarch: Charles III

Personal details
- Party: Progressive Liberal Party

Keno R. Wong is a Bahamian politician from the Progressive Liberal Party (PLP).

== Career ==
Wong is a community advocate and church leader. He was chairman of the National Neighbourhood Watch Council. In the 2026 Bahamian general election, Wong was the PLP candidate for Saint Anne's. He was defeated by Adrian White from the Free National Movement (FNM). Following the election, he was appointed to the Senate for the government.

== See also ==
- 15th Bahamian Parliament
