= Robyn Lynes =

Bahamian politician

The Honourable Robyn Lynes Senator

Member of the Senate of the Bahamas
- Incumbent
- Assumed office 19 May 2026

Personal details
- Party: Progressive Liberal Party
- Education: University of Buckingham

Robyn Dawn Lynes is a Bahamian politician from the Progressive Liberal Party (PLP).

== Education ==
She graduated from the University of Buckingham in 2006.

== Career ==
Lynes is an attormney. Lynes was the PLP candidate for Killarney at the 2026 Bahamian general election. In 2023, she was a candidate for chair of the Progressive Liberal Party. She was deputy chair. Lynes was appointed to the Senate of the Bahamas in May 2026. She was sworn in by Governor General Cynthia Pratt. She previously served in the senate. She was first appointed in 2015.

== See also ==
- 15th Bahamian Parliament
