= Picewell Forbes =

Bahamian former politician and broadcaster

Member of Parliament for Mangrove Cay and South Andros
- In office May 2007 – September 2021
- Succeeded by: Leon Lundy

Personal details
- Born: 1 August 1961 (age 65) Smith's Hill, South Andros, The Bahamas
- Party: Progressive Liberal Party
- Spouse: Drucilla Forbes
- Children: Demathio, Picecilla, Ramon and Paige
- Education: College of the Bahamas; University of the West Indies; Nova Southeastern University

Picewell A. L. "Soca" Forbes (born 1 August 1961) is a Bahamian former Progressive Liberal Party politician and broadcaster who was the Member of Parliament (MP) for Mangrove Cay and South Andros from 2007 to 2021.

== Early life and education ==
Forbes was born in Smith's Hill, South Andros. He obtained a Certificate in Electronics from the College of the Bahamas before going on to graduate with a Bachelor of Arts from the University of the West Indies in 1991 and later a Master of Science from Nova Southeastern University in 2004.

== Career ==
Prior to going into politics, Forbes worked in radio and broadcasting. He was a Deputy General Manager at the Broadcasting Corporation of the Bahamas. He hosted a number of talk shows on the Bahamas Radio Network and ZNS Radio, as well as Da Down Home Show on television.

Forbes was elected to represent Mangrove Cay and South Andros in the 2007 general election when the PLP won, with Forbes earning the highest margin of the vote of any candidate.

Forbes received some negative media attention when he mistakenly caused a mistrial in the 2009 John Travolta extortion case by passing on an unverified rumour of the result. Forbes apologised, thus no charges were pressed.

Then PLP PM Perry Christie appointed Forbes the Bahamas High Commissioner to the CARICOM secretariat in Georgetown, Guyana in 2012. He worked remotely from Nassau.

Forbes was one of four PLP candidates to win or retain their seat in the 2017 general election.

On 1 March 2021, Forbes announced in the House that he would not seek re-election in the 2021 general election and would resign from politics. There was speculation he was persuaded to stand down for Monique Pindling, but these claims were denied and the nomination ultimately went to Leon Lundy.

In July 2021, Forbes was sworn in as a Justice of the Peace by Chief Magistrate Joyann Ferguson-Pratt.

== Personal life ==
Forbes is married to Drucilla Forbes nee Wallace. He is the father of four children and is a member of the Church of God.
