= Dundas Town =

Town in the Abaco Islands, Bahamas

- Town
- Location within Bahamas
- Coordinates: 26.543986°N 77.085290°W
- Country: The Bahamas
- Island: Abaco
- District: Central Abaco
- Elevation: 4 m (13 ft)

Population
  - Estimate (2010): 2,890
- Time zone: Eastern Time Zone
- Area code: 242

Dundas Town is a town in the Abaco Islands, Bahamas, with a population of 2,890 as of 2010. It is located near Marsh Harbour.

== History ==
The settlement was named after the colonial administrator Charles Dundas. In 2019, Dundas Town was heavily destroyed by Hurricane Dorian. In 2025, there was a power outage in the community after the snapping of a Bahamas Power and Light (BPL) pole.

== Politics ==
Dundas Town is part of the Central and South Abaco parliamentary constituency for elections to the House of Assembly of the Bahamas.
