= Leslia Miller-Brice =

Bahamian politician

Member of the Parliament of the Bahamas for Sea Breeze
- Incumbent
- Assumed office 16 September 2021
- Preceded by: Lanisha T. Rolle

Personal details
- Party: Progressive Liberal Party

Leslia M. Miller-Brice is a Bahamian politician from the Progressive Liberal Party.

== Career ==
In the 2021 Bahamian general election, she was elected in Sea Breeze. Miller-Brice was one of seven Progressive Liberal Party [PLP] women candidates elected.

On 4 November 2021, she was appointed Bahamas Ambassador to the Caribbean Community (CARICOM).

She was re-elected in the 2026 Bahamian general election. She was appointed Minister of Culture, Arts and Heritage.

== See also ==
- 14th Bahamian Parliament
