= Lanisha Rolle =

Bahamian politician

Minister of Youth, Sports and Culture
- In office July 2018 – 23 February 2021
- Prime Minister: Hubert Minnis
- Preceded by: Michael Pintard
- Succeeded by: Iram Lewis

Minister of Social Services and Urban Development
- In office 15 May 2017 – July 2018
- Prime Minister: Hubert Minnis
- Succeeded by: Frankie Campbell

Member of the House of Assembly for Sea Breeze
- In office 2017–2021

Member of the Senate of the Bahamas
- In office 24 February 2015 – 13 May 2016

Personal details
- Party: Free National Movement
- Spouse: Vontenken Rolle
- Children: 3
- Education: University of the West Indies; Eugene Dupuch Law School
- Profession: Lawyer

Lanisha Rolle is a Bahamian politician and lawyer who served as Minister of Youth, Sports and Culture from 2018 to 2021 and Minister of Social Services and Urban Development from 2017 to 2018 in the government of Hubert Minnis. She was the first woman to head the Ministry of Youth, Sports and Culture. A member of the Free National Movement (FNM), she served in the Senate from 2015 to 2016 and represented Sea Breeze in the House of Assembly from 2017 to 2021.

Rolle grew up in the Over-the-Hill area of Nassau. She served in the Royal Bahamas Police Force for 11 years, including nine years in its Special Intelligence Branch, and attained the rank of corporal. She holds a law degree from the University of the West Indies and a master's degree in human resource management. She graduated from the Eugene Dupuch Law School in 2011 and was called to the Bahamas Bar on 28 October 2021.

Rolle served on the FNM's National Executive Committee and as its assistant secretary-general before entering the Senate. On the recommendation of opposition leader Hubert Minnis, she was appointed to replace Heather Hunt and was sworn in by Governor-General Marguerite Pindling on 24 February 2015.

She resigned from the Senate on 13 May 2016, following reports about a recorded private conversation with FNM political hopeful Lincoln Bain. Rolle attributed her resignation to personal reasons and said she did not want to distract from the party's work.

In the 2017 Bahamian general election, Rolle won the Sea Breeze constituency for the FNM, receiving 2,783 votes against 1,558 for Hope Strachan of the Progressive Liberal Party. She was sworn in as Minister of Social Services and Urban Development on 15 May 2017.

In a July 2018 Cabinet reshuffle, Rolle moved to the Ministry of Youth, Sports and Culture, replacing Michael Pintard, while Frankie Campbell took over the social services portfolio. She was the first woman appointed to head the Ministry of Youth, Sports and Culture.

Rolle resigned from the Cabinet on 23 February 2021. The Cabinet Office said that matters brought to Minnis's attention were under investigation and announced that Iram Lewis would replace her. She retained her seat in the House of Assembly. In an interview the following month, she said her resignation had been voluntary and denied wrongdoing in the administration of the ministry. In June 2021, Rolle said she had withdrawn her request for renomination after the FNM had not ratified her candidacy by 12 March. She said she would continue to serve as the MP for Sea Breeze for the remainder of her term.

On 15 March 2023, Rolle was arraigned on bribery and fraud-related charges alongside her husband and other defendants. The allegations concerned contracts awarded during her tenure as Minister of Youth, Sports and Culture. She was granted bail of 150,000 BSD.

At her arraignment in the Supreme Court on 23 June 2023, Rolle faced three counts of bribery and 13 counts of conspiracy to commit fraud by false pretences. The prosecution alleged corruption in the award of contracts totalling approximately 769,000 BSD between 2019 and 2021. Rolle pleaded not guilty to all charges. As of April 2026, the case against Rolle remained pending.
