= Maxine Seymour =

Bahamian politician

Member of the Senate of The Bahamas
- Incumbent
- Assumed office 6 October 2021

Personal details
- Political party: Free National Movement

Maxine V. Seymour is a Bahamian politician from the Free National Movement.

== Education ==
Seymour graduated from the following institutions:

- University of the West Indies
- College of St. Benedict
- University of The Bahamas
- Georgetown University School of Continuing Studies

== Career ==
Seymour works as the Director of Corporate Communications at the country's leading health and life insurer.

In the 2021 Bahamian general election, she was the candidate in Sea Breeze but was not elected. She was later appointed to the Senate of the Bahamas.
