= Cherokee Sound =

Village in the Abaco Islands of The Bahamas

Coordinates: 26°16′57″N 77°03′13″W

Cherokee Sound is a small village in the Abaco Islands of The Bahamas. It is one of the oldest settlements in the country.

== History ==
In the 1790s, a group of Loyalists from the Carolinas arrived on the islands via Florida, and founded Cherokee Sound.

In 1965, the Cherokee Sound had an airport identified by Federal Aviation Administration IATA code CQZ.

== Politics ==
Cherokee Sound is part of the Central and South Abaco constituency for elections to the Parliament of the Bahamas.
