= James Henry Jarrett =

British colonial administrator and judge (1895–1943)

- Born: 31 March 1895
- Died: 7 April 1943 (aged 48); St George's, Grenada
- Spouse: Ida Alexandria Dutfield (m. 1924)
- Parent(s): Henry and Caroline Mary Jarrett

James Henry Jarrett, KC (31 March 1895 – 7 April 1943) was a British colonial administrator and judge. He was Chief Justice of the Windward and Leeward Islands from 1940 until his death.

== Biography ==
The son of Henry and Caroline Mary Jarrett, Jarrett was educated at Lancing College before being called to the bar at Gray's Inn. After service in the First World War from 1914 to 1919, he was appointed an Assistant District Commissioner in Uganda in 1919. He was seconded to the Judicial Department as a Magistrate in 1922, was appointed a Magistrate in 1924, became Assistant Attorney-General in 1926, and Crown Counsel in 1927.

He was transferred to Grenada in 1929 as Attorney-General, and was Acting Administrator and Acting Chief Justice for St Vincent in 1930 and 1931. Appointed Attorney-General of the Bahamas in 1933, he was acting Chief Justice there in 1934, and Colonial Secretary from 1935 to 1940. He was Deputy Governor in 1935 and acting Governor on several occasions between 1936 and 1939. He was also appointed a King's Counsel for the Bahamas.

He was appointed Chief Justice of the Windward and Leeward Islands in 1940, and was a member of the West Indian Court of Appeal. He died in St George's, Grenada.

He married Ida Alexandria Dutfield in 1924; they had a son and a daughter.
