= Quinton Lightbourne =

Bahamian senator

The Honourable Quinton Lightbourne
- Official portrait, 2021

Senate of The Bahamas
- In office October 4, 2021 – October 7, 2024
- Prime Minister: Philip "Brave" Davis

Personal details
- Party: Progressive Liberal Party
- Education: University of The Bahamas, Lincoln University (Pennsylvania)

Quinton C. Lightbourne (born 20 April) is a former Bahamian senator for the Progressive Liberal Party currently serving as Executive Director for the Caribbean Constituency on the Boards of the Inter-American Development Bank. Lightbourne has held prominent roles across the public and private sectors, including his tenure as a Senator and Chairman of The Bahamas Development Bank from 2021 to 2024.

== Early life and education ==
Quinton Lightbourne was born in Nassau, Bahamas and attended the University of The Bahamas (then College of The Bahamas) where he was elected as the president of the College of The Bahamas Union of Students (COBUS). He also attended Lincoln University (Pennsylvania) where he received a Bachelor of Science in Finance with a minor in Accounting (Hons). Lightbourne was initiated as a member of Kappa Alpha Psi fraternity through the Epsilon chapter.

== Political career ==
Quinton Lightbourne was appointed as senator on October 4, 2021 by Governor General His Excellency the Most Hon. Sir Cornelius A. Smith acting on the advice of Prime Minister Philip Davis. Lighbourne resigned from the Senate during a session on October 7, 2024, calling his tenure "one of the greatest moments of his life". Ja'Ann Major was appointed to the Senate to fill this vacancy.

== Finance career ==
Lightbourne has worked in the public and private sectors. His roles included operations and funds analyst at Credit Suisse AG, Nassau Branch, and investment officer at The Bahamas Investment Authority in the office of the prime minister. He was an investment and finance columnist for The Nassau Guardian.

Quinton Lightbourne was chairman of The Bahamas Development Bank in November 2021 to September 2024. He is the youngest person ever appointed to this position. As Chairman, he facilitated a $30 million BSD capitalization through a partnership with the African Export-Import Bank, the largest in the institution’s fifty-year history.
