= Michela Barnett-Ellis =

Bahamian politician

Member of Parliament for Killarney
- Incumbent
- Assumed office 12 May 2026
- Preceded by: Hubert Minnis

Member of the Senate of the Bahamas
- In office February 2022 – 2026

Personal details
- Party: Free National Movement

Michela Barnett-Ellis is a Bahamian politician from the Free National Movement who serves as a member of the House of Assembly. She previously served as a member of the Senate of the Bahamas.

== Life ==
Barnett-Ellis was born in about 1982. Her parents were Lady Camilla and Sir Michael Barnett. Her father had been the Chief Justice of the Bahamas for six years and her mother, who was from Canada, worked for the University of the Bahamas and she led an AIDS foundation.

Barnett-Ellis became a lawyer and she was admitted to the Bar of England and Wales. She practised in the Bahamas and she became a partner in a law firm. In 2017 she joined the National Insurance Board.

Vianna Gardiner had briefly been made a senator in the 14th Bahamian Parliament, she resigned so that she could take up a position in the private sector. She resigned at the end of 2021 and she was replaced by Barnett-Ellis in February 2022. She was nominated by the Free National Movement party.

In 2025 it was speculated that she would be put forward by her political party as a potential candidate for the Killarney constituency at the next election. In the 2026 Bahamian general election, she was elected MP.

== See also ==
- 15th Bahamian Parliament
