= Dionisio D'Aguilar =

Bahamian politician and businessman

The Honourable Dionisio D'Aguilar

Minister of Tourism and Aviation
- In office 15 May 2017 – September 2021
- Preceded by: Obie Wilchcombe
- Succeeded by: Chester Cooper

Member of Parliament for Freetown
- In office May 10, 2017 – September 2021
- Preceded by: Richard Lightbourne
- Succeeded by: Wayne Munroe

Personal details
- Born: October 15, 1964 (age 61) Nassau, Bahamas
- Citizenship: Bahamas
- Party: Free National Movement
- Spouse: Saskia Schutte (m. 1990)
- Children: 2
- Education: Cornell University
- Occupation: Businessman

Dionisio James D'Aguilar (born October 15, 1964) is a Bahamian Free National Movement (FNM) politician who was the Member of Parliament (MP) for Freetown and Minister of Tourism and Aviation from 2017 to 2021. Before getting involved in politics, he was a well-known businessman who served on the board of directors for multiple companies.

== Early life and career ==
D'Aguilar was born in Nassau on October 15, 1964, to Vincent D'Aguilar and Marina Benjamin, and attended Rugby School in England for his early education. He then studied at Cornell University, receiving his Bachelor of Arts (BA) in hotel administration in 1986 before earning his Master of Business Administration (MBA) one year later. He remained in New York state for five years while working as a Certified Public Accountant (CPA) before returning to the Bahamas, where he has served as the president and CEO of Superwash Limited, a chain of self-service laundromats, since 1993.

D'Aguilar later served on the board of directors for companies such as Insurance Company of The Bahamas, J.S. Johnson Insurance, AML Foods Limited, Bahamar, and the Bahamas Electricity Corporation. As an active member of the community, he also presided as the president of the Bahamas Chamber of Commerce and the Bahamas Breast Cancer Initiative.

== Political career ==
Prior to his political career, D'Aguilar was often in the news for challenging the government on issues such as fiscal policy and strict immigration. He committed to running for a Parliamentary seat in the 2017 general election under the FNM platform, submitting his name for consideration. He was officially ratified by the party in October 2016 to represent the Freetown constituency, then still known as Montague. The incumbent, Richard Lightbourne, had fallen out of favor with the party, which is why they looked to replace him. Leading up to the election, D'Aguilar said that the country was "becoming a socialist state" in response to a proposed reform of the Employment and Industrial Relations Acts which increased the maximum length of redundancy pay, calling the idea "absolutely crazy." He also criticized government social programs and overspending.

D'Aguilar won the seat after defeating Progressive Liberal Party (PLP) candidate Wayne Munroe with 60 percent of the vote; the FNM also won 35 of 39 seats. Five days later he was sworn in as Minister of Tourism and Aviation by new Prime Minister Hubert Minnis, and in June he was elected to a one-year term as chairman of the Caribbean Tourism Organization (CTO). In 2018, he was named the Caribbean Tourism Minister of the Year at the Caribbean Travel Awards, receiving praise for adding new hotels and securing additional flights to the islands. Caribbean Journal reported that no other country in the region had a more impressive surge in their tourism sector that year.

The COVID-19 pandemic dealt devastating blows to the tourism industry, and it was no exception in the Bahamas, where airports and seaports were closed to visitors starting on March 24, 2020. In June, he announced the Tourism Readiness and Recovery Plan, a four-phase strategy for re-opening the international tourist economy. In January 2021, in response to U.S. President Joe Biden's executive order requiring returning tourists to self-quarantine, D'Aguilar said the move was "simply devastating" because it represented a "significant deterrent to travel." The following month he expressed satisfaction with the rate of COVID-19 vaccination in the United States, projecting an improvement in the domestic situation by the third quarter of the year.

== Personal life ==
D'Aguilar married Dutch citizen and fellow Cornell alum Saskia Schutte in 1990, and brought her back with him to Nassau the following year. The couple has two sons, Alexander and Oliver, both of whom played football.

Saskia bonded with Dionisio's father, Vincent, over his art collection, often going to art shows and galleries together as he taught her about the local scene. After his death in 2008, she lobbied the family to open the D'Aguilar Art Foundation to preserve and display his collection, serving as its director.

According to the declared financial declarations, Dionisio D'Aguilar is worth US$37.9 million (2021).
