= Bradley R. Fox =

Bahamian politician

Member of Parliament for Central and South Abaco
- Incumbent
- Assumed office 12 May 2026
- Preceded by: John Pinder II

Personal details
- Party: Progressive Liberal Party

Bradley R. Fox is a Bahamian politician from the Progressive Liberal Party (PLP). He was elected member of the House of Assembly for Central and South Abaco in 2026.

== Biography ==
Fox comes from Sandy Point.

== See also ==
- 15th Bahamian Parliament
