= Leon Lundy =

Bahamian politician

Member of the Parliament of the Bahamas for Mangrove Cay and South Andros
- Incumbent
- Assumed office 16 September 2021
- Preceded by: Picewell Forbes

Personal details
- Party: Progressive Liberal Party
- Website: https://www.leonlundy.com/

Leon Edwards Lundy is a Bahamian politician from the Progressive Liberal Party (PLP).

== Education ==
Lundy attended Mangrove Cay High School.

== Career ==
In the 2021 Bahamian general election, he was elected in Mangrove Cay and South Andros. On January 2, 2024, he was appointed Minister of State in the Office of the Prime Minister. He is a candidate in the 2026 Bahamian general election.

== See also ==
- 14th Bahamian Parliament
