= Pia Glover-Rolle =

Bahamian politician

Pia Glover-Rolle M.P.
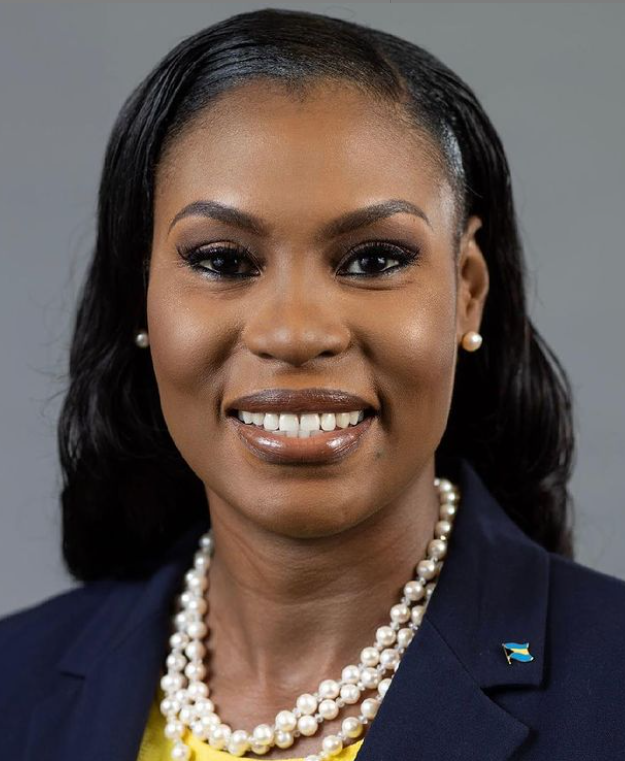

Minister of Labour and Public Service
- Incumbent
- Assumed office 23 September 2021
- Prime Minister: Philip "Brave" Davis

Member of Parliament for Golden Gates
- Incumbent
- Assumed office 6 October 2021
- Preceded by: Michael Foulkes
- Majority: 695 (20%)

Personal details
- Born: Pia Takita Glover; 18 April 1977 (age 49) Nassau, Bahamas
- Party: Progressive Liberal Party
- Spouse: Herman N. Rolle

Pia Takita Glover-Rolle (born 18 April 1977) is a Bahamian politician, entrepreneur and philanthropist who has served as Minister of Public Service, Labour and National Insurance since 18 May 2026. A member of the Progressive Liberal Party (PLP), she has represented Golden Gates in the House of Assembly since 2021. She previously served as Minister of State for Public Service from September 2021 to September 2023 and as Minister of Labour and Public Service from September 2023 to May 2026.

Glover-Rolle was first elected in the 2021 general election, defeating the incumbent, Michael Foulkes of the Free National Movement (FNM).[1] She was re-elected in the general election held on 12 May 2026, again defeating Foulkes.

== Career ==
Glover-Rolle is the Founder of PTG Marketing & Modeling Agency and Model and Talent Showcase of the Islands (Island MMTS). Glover-Rolle is a certified Labour Advocate and Human Resources Specialist. She holds a degree in Hospitality Management with certifications in Labour Relations, Employment Law and Management. She is also a Justice of the Peace and a Labour & Immigration Consultant.

Glover-Rolle was ratified as the PLP candidate for the Golden Gates constituency in March 2021. She unseated FNM incumbent Michael Foulkes. After the election, she was appointed Minister of State for the Public Service by new prime minister Philip "Brave" Davis. Glover-Rolle was officially sworn in to parliament on 6 October 2021. She is part of the largest number of females to serve in a Bahamian parliament. In a cabinet shuffle, Glover-Rolle was promoted to become the Minister of Labour and Public Service on 11 September 2023. She is The Bahamas’ first female Minister of Labour and Public Service, advancing labour reform, workforce development, and public-service modernization. On 4 October 2023, the Honourable Prime Minister Philip Davis, named Glover-Rolle Deputy Leader of Government Business in The Bahamas Parliament. She would be the first person to officially hold that post. She is appointed to the House Rules & Business Committee, as well as the inaugural Parliamentary Human Rights Committee (HOA), the Parliamentary Services Commission and the Inter-Parliamentary Union (HOA) Committee.

== Personal life ==
Glover-Rolle has been married since May 2000 and has three daughters.

== Electoral history ==
2021 Golden Gates constituency election
Party	Candidate	Votes	Percentage
PLP	Pia T. Glover Rolle	1,872	53.87%
FNM	Michael Foulkes (inc.)	1,777	33.87%
COI	Sharmaine Adderley	263	7.57%
DNA	Lamont Nixon	85	2.45%
	Others	78	2.25%
Total		4,075	100%
