= Elizabeth (Bahamas Parliament constituency) =

Bahamas parliamentary constituency

- Constituency
- Elizabeth is 8 on this map of the 2021 election
- District: New Providence
- Electorate: 3,923 (2011)

Current constituency
- Seats: 1
- Party: Progressive Liberal Party
- Member: JoBeth Coleby-Davis

Elizabeth is a parliamentary constituency represented in the House of Assembly of the Bahamas. It elects one member of parliament (MP) using the First past the post electoral system. It has been represented by JoBeth Coleby-Davis from the Progressive Liberal Party since 2021.

== Geography ==
The constituency comprises the Elizabeth Estates area of Nassau, the capital and largest city of the Bahamas.

== Members of Parliament ==
Election	Parliament	Candidate	Party
2007	11th Bahamian Parliament	Malcolm Adderley	Progressive Liberal Party
2010	11th Bahamian Parliament	Ryan Pinder	Progressive Liberal Party
2012	12th Bahamian Parliament	Ryan Pinder	Progressive Liberal Party
2017	13th Bahamian Parliament	Duane Sands	Free National Movement
2021	14th Bahamian Parliament	JoBeth Coleby-Davis	Progressive Liberal Party
2026	15th Bahamian Parliament	JoBeth Coleby-Davis	Progressive Liberal Party

== Election results ==
2021
Party	Candidate	Votes	%	±%
PLP	JoBeth Coleby-Davis	1,893	48.91	▲18.91
FNM	Duane Sands (incumbent)	1,516	39.17	▼21.83
COI	Cara Ellis	204	5.27	
Independent	Craig Bowe	165	4.26	▲3.26
DNA	Hillary Deveaux	66	1.71	▼3.29
United Coalition Movement	Bernard Rolle	22	0.57	
Grand Commonwealth Party	Rozanna Moore	4	0.10	
Turnout		3,870	67.79	
PLP gain from FNM				

== See also ==
- Constituencies of the Bahamas
