= 2026 Bahamian general election =

- 12 May 2026

All 41 seats in the House of Assembly 21 seats needed for a majority
- Registered: 209,264
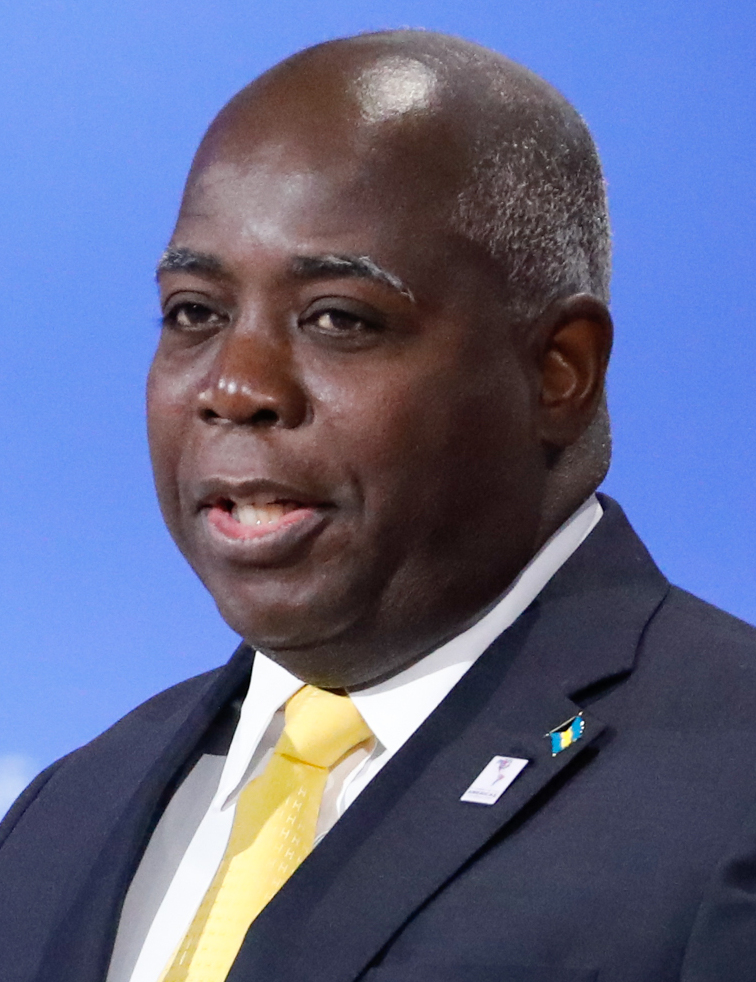

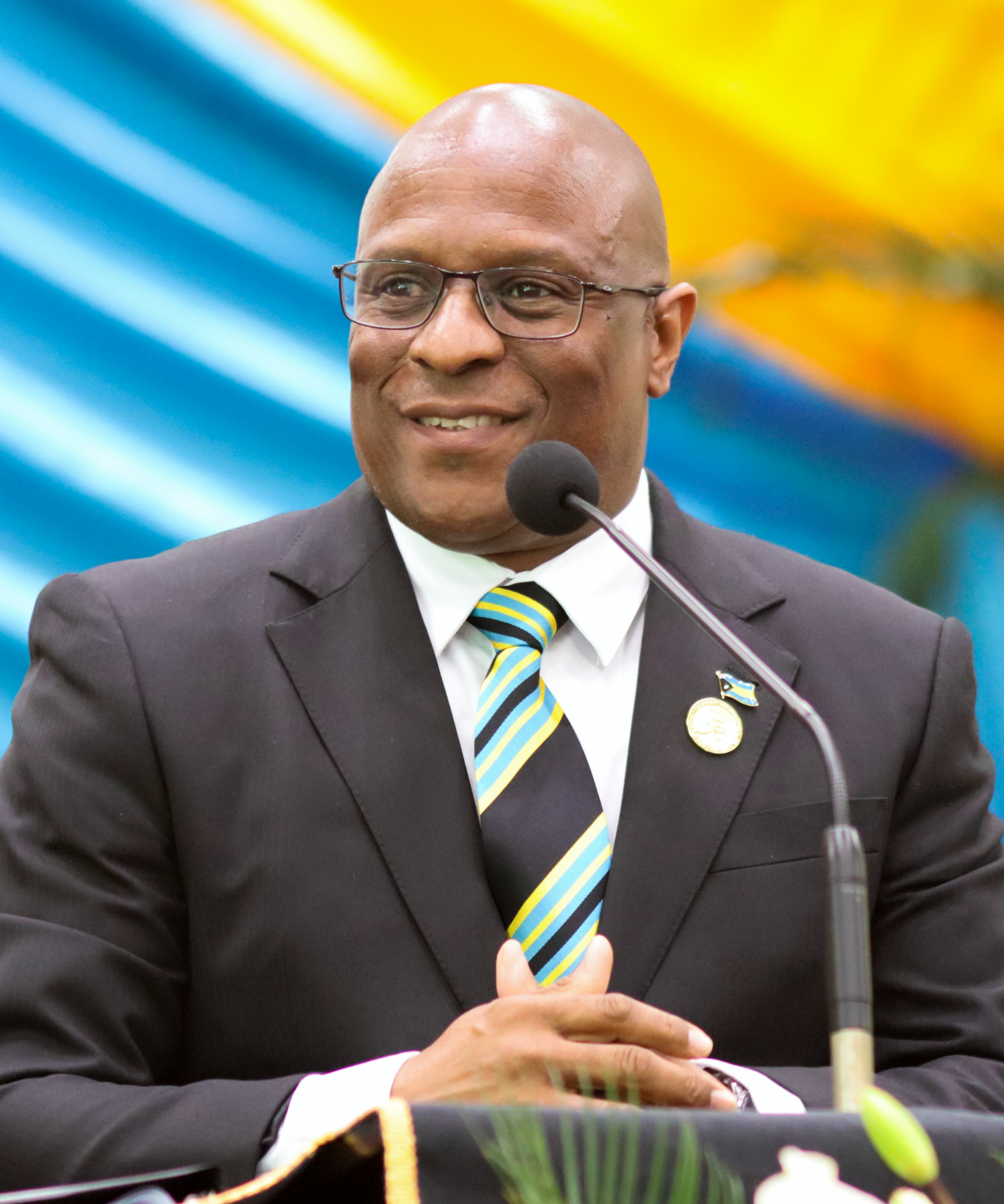
	First party	Second party
Leader	Philip Davis	Michael Pintard
Party	PLP	FNM
Leader's seat	Cat Island, Rum Cay & San Salvador	Marco City
Last election	52.59%, 32 seats	36.45%, 7 seats
Seats won	33	8
Seat change	▲1	▲1
Popular vote	71,908	49,538
Percentage	51.21%	35.28%
Prime Minister before election
Philip Davis
PLP
Elected Prime Minister
Philip Davis
PLP

General elections were held in the Bahamas on 12 May 2026 to elect all 41 members of the House of Assembly. The election was called early by Prime Minister Philip Davis, with Parliament dissolved on 8 April 2026 and the writs of election issued the following day. The election was held using 41 constituencies following a boundary review that created two additional seats, St James and Bimini and Berry Islands.

FNM leader Michael Pintard conceded the election four hours after the polls closed, with results being largely similar to the 2021 election. The election resulted in the re-election of the PLP and a second consecutive term under Davis, the first Bahamian prime minister to win a second term since the 1997 election.

== Background ==
In the 2021 general election, held on 16 September 2021, the Progressive Liberal Party (PLP) led by opposition leader Philip Davis defeated the incumbent Free National Movement (FNM) government of Prime Minister Hubert Minnis, winning 32 of the 39 seats in the House of Assembly. Minnis conceded defeat on election night and Davis was sworn in as Prime Minister on 17 September 2021. The PLP's 32 seats were its highest seat total since the 1982 election, while the FNM's seven seats were its lowest total since the 1977 election. Former prime minister Perry Christie argued after the 2021 result that, for more than two decades, no Bahamian government had won consecutive terms, and said the incoming administration's "survival" would depend on understanding this voting pattern.

Following their election defeat, the FNM selected Michael Pintard as its new leader in November 2021. Pintard defeated a leadership challenge in June 2024.

=== By-elections and defections ===
During the 2021–2026 parliamentary term, two House of Assembly seats became vacant following the deaths of sitting PLP MPs and were filled in by-elections, while one MP changed party affiliation.

On 25 September 2023, Minister of Social Services, Information and Broadcasting and West Grand Bahama and Bimini MP Obie Wilchcombe died in office, triggering a by-election in the constituency. On 22 November 2023, PLP candidate Kingsley Smith won with 2,150 votes, defeating FNM candidate Bishop Ricardo Grant (1,276) in the by-election.

On 2 April 2025, Iram Lewis (Central Grand Bahama) resigned from the FNM and joined the Coalition of Independents (COI), becoming the party's first sitting representative in Parliament.

On 28 September 2025, Minister of Environment and Natural Resources and Golden Isles MP Vaughn Miller died, creating another vacancy in the House. On 24 November 2025, in the Golden Isles by-election, PLP candidate Darron Pickstock won 1,873 votes (48.36%) ahead of FNM candidate Brian Brown (1,636).

== Timeline ==
On 1 April 2026, Davis announced that he would advise the Governor-General to dissolve Parliament on 8 April, that the writs of election would be issued on 9 April, and that polling day would be held on 12 May. He also said that the register of voters for the election would close at the end of 8 April, the statutory deadline for new registrations and constituency transfers. The election was called several months before the last possible date, as the next general election had not been due until mid-October 2026. An official in Davis's office said the early timing was intended to avoid disruption from the upcoming Atlantic hurricane season.

On 8 April, Police Commissioner Shanta Knowles, acting as provost marshal, read the proclamation dissolving Parliament. The next session of Parliament was set for 20 May. Nomination Day was held on 16 April, and the advance poll was scheduled for 30 April.

== Electoral system ==
Members of the House of Assembly are elected from single-member constituencies using first-past-the-post voting. The majority party then selects the Prime Minister, who is appointed by the Governor-General.

Electoral boundaries are reviewed ahead of general elections by a Constituencies Commission. In 2024, a new Constituencies Commission was appointed to begin another review of the electoral boundaries in preparation for the next general election. By late 2025, the commission was considering changes to several large or sparsely populated constituencies, including MICAL, Killarney, Golden Isles, and West Grand Bahama and Bimini. The commission had proposed creating two new constituencies by splitting Killarney and West Grand Bahama and Bimini, citing the size of those electorates, including reports that Killarney had more than 7,000 registered voters and West Grand Bahama and Bimini had 6,070. In January 2026, the commission's report was tabled in the House of Assembly, which approved the creation of two new constituencies — St James and Bimini and Berry Islands — raising the total number of constituencies from 39 to 41. The changes were set out in the House of Assembly Revision of Boundaries and Re-distribution of Seats Order, 2026 (S.I. No. 5 of 2026), which divided the Bahamas into 41 constituencies: 25 in New Providence, five in Grand Bahama, and 11 in the Family Islands. The order specified that the revised boundaries and seat distribution would apply from the next general election.

In 2025, the government introduced the Parliamentary Elections (Amendment) Bill, 2025 as part of a package of election administration reforms. Among other measures, the bill provided for the introduction of optional biometric voter cards, secure electronic poll books, and voter verification exercises every ten years. The legislation replaced the concept of a permanent voter card with a biometric card valid for ten years and allowed biometric data already held by the passport office to be used (with the voter's consent). The Senate passed the bill in August 2025.

In January 2026, more than 196,000 people were registered to vote, with work continuing to remove duplicate registrations and deceased persons from the register ahead of the general election. By April 2026, more than 209,000 voters were registered. The new biometric voter card was not mandatory; voters could use the existing purple voter card in the 2026 election.

== Election administration and observation ==
The elections were monitored by election observers, including missions from the Commonwealth, the Organization of American States (OAS), the Caribbean Community (CARICOM), and accredited United States embassy observers. On 20 April 2026, the OAS and the Government of the Bahamas signed an agreement establishing the privileges and immunities of an OAS Electoral Observation Mission for the election. The OAS said this would be the fourth time it had observed an election in the Bahamas and designated Sherry Tross of Saint Kitts and Nevis as chief of mission. The United States also planned to deploy accredited embassy observers. CARICOM mounted a nine-member Election Observation Mission from nine member states, which operated from 5 to 15 May. The Commonwealth deployed a Commonwealth Observer Group consisting of eminent persons from across the Commonwealth, led by former Prime Minister of Jamaica Bruce Golding.

A record of more than 200,000 people were registered to vote.

Ahead of the advance poll, early voting was available to categories including senior citizens, special voters, members of the uniformed branches, students abroad and pregnant women. The Parliamentary Registration Department said that overseas voting would take place at 13 missions, with about 400 voters expected to cast ballots abroad, while advance polling in the Bahamas would be held at 17 polling stations in New Providence and Grand Bahama. The OAS said eligibility for the advance poll had been expanded to include elderly persons and persons with disabilities, resulting in about 26,000 registered advance voters, the highest number recorded in a Bahamian election.

CARICOM said that voters were able to cast their ballots in a peaceful and orderly manner and that the results were in keeping with the will of the people of the Bahamas. In its preliminary findings, the Commonwealth Observer Group described polling day as peaceful, orderly and transparent, but reiterated concerns about the absence of an independent electoral management body, but also noted operational problems during the advance poll, including overcrowding, long waiting times and voter confusion over registration procedures and polling assignments. The OAS reported that the election proceeded in an orderly manner, with no significant incidents, but noted that electronic poll books were not deployed, that the advance poll experienced delays and long lines. The OAS also noted that the Parliamentary Registration Department's official website did not publish preliminary results on election night. According to the mission, the public's main source of election-night results was media reporting based on information provided by the PRD.

== Parties and leaders ==
In addition to the two principal parties in the Bahamas, the PLP and the FNM, independent politicians and the COI also contested the election.

Parties and leaders
Party	Leader	Candidates
PLP	Philip Davis	41
FNM	Michael Pintard	41
COI	Lincoln Bain	40
Independents	N/A	16

== Campaign ==
Philip Davis and the PLP sought a second consecutive term, something that no prime minister or party had managed to achieve in the country in nearly 30 years.

The campaign took place against a backdrop of concerns over the cost of living, crime, immigration, government transparency, housing, healthcare and public services. Affordability concerns included rising housing costs and stagnant wages, while housing remained a challenge despite efforts by recent PLP and FNM governments to expand access to housing. On 1 April 2026, the government removed VAT from unprepared food sold in grocery stores, a measure it had presented as relief for households facing the rising cost of living.

The governing PLP launched its 2026 platform, Blueprint for Progress, at the University of the Bahamas in April 2026. The platform included proposals on migrant health insurance, tighter immigration enforcement, expanded worker protections, artificial intelligence and digital government, housing, competition policy, agriculture, healthcare and Family Island development. Davis said the PLP had completed or commenced 325 of the 387 commitments made in its 2021 Blueprint for Change, and the government released a public tracker of those commitments.

The opposition FNM released a 54-page manifesto titled We Work For You. The party promised to remove VAT from everyday essentials, medical costs and educational supplies, introduce a national lottery, build at least 5,000 homes, begin implementation of the Freedom of Information Act within 90 days of taking office, and hire 100 doctors and 200 nurses. Immigration, especially irregular migration from Haiti, became one of the main campaign issues. The FNM placed greater emphasis on sovereignty and immigration enforcement late in the campaign, using the slogan "Save our Sovereignty".

The COI campaigned as an alternative to the two major parties and promoted a first-100-days programme focused on immigration, crime, healthcare, education and culture. The election was expected to be mainly a contest between the PLP and FNM, although the COI had drawn attention during the campaign. No prime minister of an independent Bahamas had previously been elected from a third party.

== Candidates ==
Nomination Day was held on 16 April 2026. Parliamentary Commissioner Harrison Thompson said that about 130 candidates were nominated across the 41 constituencies, with no applications rejected and only limited issues reported in a few constituencies. The official list of nominated candidates was published in the Bahamas Gazette.

Several sitting or former MPs contested the election outside their previous party arrangements. Former prime minister Hubert Minnis ran as an independent candidate in Killarney after severing ties with the FNM, while former MP Frederick McAlpine and MP Leroy Major also announced independent bids. In April 2025, Iram Lewis had resigned from the FNM and joined the Coalition of Independents, becoming the party's first sitting MP.

In June 2025, two PLP MPs, Alfred Sears of Fort Charlotte and Basil McIntosh of MICAL, announced that they would not seek re-election. Ahead of Nomination Day, the PLP's National General Council ratified its slate of candidates by early February 2026, while the FNM had ratified 39 candidates by 4 February. The COI also ratified candidates before the election; in September 2024 the party unveiled its first 19 candidates, and in January 2026 it said it had three ratifications remaining to complete a full slate. The COI did not nominate a candidate for the MICAL constituency.

=== Candidates by constituency ===
Candidates (incumbents in bold) by constituency:

Constituency	PLP	FNM	COI	Independent
Bain Town and Grants Town	**Wayde Watson**	Jay Philippe	Antonio Bain	Brenda Pinder-Harris
Bamboo Town	**Patricia Deveaux**	Duane Sands	Maria Daxon	
Bimini and Berry Islands	Randy Rolle	**Carlton Bowleg**	Hyram Rolle	Paul Rolle
Carmichael	**Keith Bell**	Arinthia Komolafe	Charlotte Green	O'Brien Thomas Knowles, Simeon Mackey
Cat Island, Rum Cay & San Salvador	**Philip Davis**	Mike Holmes	Donna McKay	
Central and South Abaco	Bradley R. Fox	Jeremy Sweeting	Crystal Williams	
Central and South Eleuthera	**Clay Sweeting**	Philippa Kelly	Bekera Grant-Taylor	
Central Grand Bahama	Parkco R. Deal	Frazette Gibson	**Iram Lewis**	
Centreville	**Jomo Campbell**	Darvin Russell	Jamaal Woodside	
East Grand Bahama	Monique Pratt	**Kwasi Thompson**	Dexter Edwards	
Englerston	**Glenys Hanna Martin**	Heather McDonald	Faith Percentie	
Elizabeth	**JoBeth Coleby-Davis**	Heather Watkins-Hunt	Donna Dorsett-Major	
Fort Charlotte	Sebastian Bastian	Travis Robinson	Daphaney Johnson	
Fox Hill	**Fred Mitchell**	Nicholas Fox	Bobby Brown	
Freetown	**Wayne Munroe**	Lincoln Deal II	Olivia Ingraham-Griffin	Andrew Johnson, Patrice Hanna-Carey
Garden Hills	**Mario Bowleg**	Rick Fox	Shantiqua Ayesha Cleare	
Golden Gates	**Pia Glover-Rolle**	Michael Foulkes	Sharmaine Adderley	Anthony Rahming
Golden Isles	**Darron Pickstock**	Brian Brown	Brian Rolle	Karen Kim Butler
Killarney	Robyn Lynes	Michela Barnett-Ellis	Veronica McIver	**Hubert Minnis**
Long Island	Reneika Knowles	Andre Rollins	Shura Pratt	Natasha Turnquest
Mangrove Cay and South Andros	**Leon Lundy**	Julian Gibson	Carlton Cleare	
Marathon	**Lisa Rahming**	Jacqueline Penn-Knowles	Tyrone Greene	
Marco City	Eddie Whann	**Michael Pintard**	Jillian Bartlett	
MICAL	Ronnell Armbrister	J. Leo Ferguson		Kate Williamson
Mount Moriah	**McKell Bonaby**	Marvin Dames	Linda Stubbs	
Nassau Village	**Jamahl Strachan**	Gadville McDonald	Stephen McQueen	
North Abaco	**Kirk Cornish**	Terrece Bootle	Cay Mills	Ryan Forbes
North Andros	**Leonardo Lightbourne**	Janice Oliver	Indera Laing	
North Eleuthera	**Sylvannus Petty**	Howard Rickey Mackey	Natasha Mitchell	
Pineridge	**Ginger Moxey**	Charlene Reid	Daniel Mitchell	Frederick McAlpine
Pinewood	**Myles Laroda**	Denarii Rolle	Lincoln Bain	
Saint Anne's	Keno Wong	**Adrian White**	Graham Weatherford	Otis Forbes
Saint Barnabas	**Michael Halkitis**	Jamal Moss	Karen Butler	
Sea Breeze	**Leslia Miller-Brice**	Trevania Clarke-Hall	William Knowles Jr.	
South Beach	**Bacchus Rolle**	Darren Henfield	Karon Farrington	
Southern Shores	S. Obie Roberts	Denalee Penn-Knowles	Kirk Farrington	**Leroy Major**
St. James	Owen C. B. Wells	**Shanendon Cartwright**	Latoya Bain	Craig Powell, Elkin Benedict Sutherland
Tall Pines	**Michael Darville**	Serfent Rolle	Trevor Greene	
The Exumas and Ragged Island	**Chester Cooper**	Debra Moxey-Rolle	Byron Smith	Deidre Ann Taylor
West Grand Bahama	**Kingsley Smith**	Omar Isaacs	Toni Stubbs-Albury	
Yamacraw	**Zane Lightbourne**	Elsworth Johnson	Yvette Prince	

== Opinion polls ==
Polling for the election was conducted by Public Domain Research and Strategy.

Date	Ref	FNM	PLP	COI	Lead
12 May 2026		35%	51%	12%	16%
11 May 2026		17%	46%	22%	24%
12–24 February 2026		18%	38%	12%	20%
16 September 2021		36%	53%	-	17%

== Results ==
Incumbent prime minister Philip Davis and his ruling Progressive Liberal Party were re-elected to a second term. Davis was the first incumbent Bahamian leader to secure re-election since 1997. Preliminary results showed the PLP winning 33 of 41 seats, nearly matching the results in 2021. The PLP won both newly created constituencies, St James and Bimini and Berry Islands. FNM candidates dominated in the outer edges of the Lucayan Archipelago, winning in the constituencies of Central Grand Bahama, East Grand Bahama, Marco City, MICAL, Long Island, St. Anne's, Freetown and Killarney. The PLP was dominant in New Providence, holding all but three seats on the island: Freetown, Killarney and St Anne's.

Deputy FNM leader Shanendon Cartwright lost in St. James, while FNM chairman Duane Sands also lost in Bamboo Town. Other notable defeated candidates included former prime minister Hubert Minnis, former NBA player Rick Fox and Cabinet minister Wayne Munroe. The third party COI did not win any seats, but their leader Lincoln Bain finished ahead of the FNM candidate in his constituency, while deputy party leader Veronica McIver in Killarney finished close to Minnis. Nine women were elected, seven from the PLP and two from the FNM.

Party	Votes	%	Seats	+/–
Progressive Liberal Party	71,908	51.21	33	+1
Free National Movement	49,538	35.28	8	+1
Coalition of Independents	17,151	12.21	0	0
Independents	1,828	1.30	0	0
Total	140,425	100.00	41	+2
Total votes	140,425	–		
Registered voters/turnout	209,264	67.10		
Source: Parliamentary Registration Department

== Aftermath ==
Davis appealed for unity and acknowledged the low turnout, stating that it was not good for democracy in the Bahamas and that more must be done to ensure every voter felt like their ballot mattered. He was sworn in for his second term on 14 May. Regional leaders including Jamaican prime minister Andrew Holness and Barbadian prime minister Mia Mottley, as well as United States Secretary of State Marco Rubio, congratulated Davis on his re-election.

FNM leader Pintard delivered a concession speech that partly attributed the party's loss to votes cast for COI and independent candidates, splitting the vote. After the election, Pintard did not immediately commit to remaining FNM leader, saying he would discuss the matter with his team in the following days. COI leader Lincoln Bain conceded that the party had failed to win a single constituency, including the Pinewood constituency that he contested. PLP politician Glenys Hanna Martin was pleased with the number of women elected, but stated that the Bahamas parliament was still a long way from gender parity.
