= Mangrove Cay and South Andros =

Bahamas parliamentary constituency

- Constituency
- Mangrove Cay and South Andros on a map of the 2021 election
- District: Mangrove Cay and South Andros
- Electorate: 2,335 (2021)

Current constituency
- Seats: 1
- Party: Progressive Liberal Party
- Member: Leon Lundy

Mangrove Cay and South Andros is a parliamentary constituency represented in the House of Assembly of the Bahamas. It elects one member of parliament using the first past the post electoral system. It has been represented by Leon Lundy from the Progressive Liberal Party since 2021.

== Geography ==
The constituency comprises the districts of Mangrove Cay and South Andros.

== Members of Parliament ==
| Election | Parliament | Candidate | Party |
|---|---|---|---|
| 1967 - 1997 | | Sir Lynden Pindling | Progressive Liberal Party |
| 2002 | 10th Bahamian Parliament | R Whitney Bastian (Independent PLP) | Progressive Liberal Party |
| 2007 | 11th Bahamian Parliament | Picewell Forbes | Progressive Liberal Party |
| 2012 | 12th Bahamian Parliament | Picewell Forbes | Progressive Liberal Party |
| 2017 | 13th Bahamian Parliament | Picewell Forbes | Progressive Liberal Party |
| 2021 | 14th Bahamian Parliament | Leon Lundy | Progressive Liberal Party |
| 2026 | 15th Bahamian Parliament | Leon Lundy | Progressive Liberal Party |

== Election results ==
2021
| Party | Candidate | Votes | % | ±% |
|---|---|---|---|---|
| PLP | Leon Lundy | 990 | 58.03 | ▲12.03 |
| FNM | D'Angelo Ferguson | 613 | 35.93 | ▼3.07 |
| Grand Commonwealth Party | Yorick Sands | 40 | 2.34 | |
| Independent | Angelo Smith | 30 | 1.76 | |
| Bahamas Constitution Party | Cornelius E. Mckinney | 20 | 1.17 | |
| COI | Trevor Greene | 13 | 0.76 | |
| Turnout | | 1,706 | 73.06 | |
| PLP hold | | | | |

== See also ==
- Constituencies of the Bahamas
