= Central and South Abaco =

- Constituency
- The Bahamas constituencies in 2021
- District: Abaco Islands
- Electorate: 3,372

Current constituency
- Seats: 1
- Party: Progressive Liberal Party
- Member: John Pinder II
- Created from: South Abaco

Central and South Abaco is a parliamentary constituency represented in the House of Assembly of the Bahamas. It is located in the Abaco Islands and includes the communities of Dundas Town, Murphy Town, and Sandy Point. The current Member of Parliament (MP) is Bradley R. Fox. It was previously held by John Pinder II.

== Members of Parliament ==
Election	Member	Party
2007	Edison Key	Free National
2017	James Albury	Free National
2021	John Pinder II	Progressive Liberal
2026	Bradley R. Fox	Progressive Liberal

== Election results ==
2021
Party	Candidate	Votes	%	±%
PLP	John Pinder II	766	41.54	
FNM	Vandea Stuart	693	37.58	
COI	Antoinette Dean	258	13.99	▼10.8
Kingdom Government Movement	Eva Bain	127	6.89	
Turnout		1,844	55.96	
PLP gain from FNM				

== See also ==
- Constituencies of the Bahamas
