= Mount Moriah (Bahamas Parliament constituency) =

Bahamas parliamentary constituency

- Constituency
- Mount Moriah is 17 on this map of the 2021 election
- District: New Providence
- Electorate: 4,277 (2011); 5,345 (2021)

Current constituency
- Seats: 1
- Party: Progressive Liberal Party
- Member: McKell Bonaby

Mount Moriah is a parliamentary constituency represented in the House of Assembly of the Bahamas. It elects one member of parliament (MP) using the first past the post electoral system. It has been represented by McKell Bonaby from the Progressive Liberal Party since 2021.

== Geography ==
The constituency comprises an inner city area of Nassau, the capital and largest city of the Bahamas. It consists of Yellow Elder Gardens to the East; Millennium Gardens in the centre and Stapledon Gardens to the West.

== Members of Parliament ==
| Election | Parliament | Candidate | Party |
|---|---|---|---|
| 1992 | 8th Bahamian Parliament | Tommy Turnquest | Free National Movement |
| 1997 | 9th Bahamian Parliament | Tommy Turnquest | Free National Movement |
| 2002 | 10th Bahamian Parliament | Koed Smith | Progressive Liberal Party |
| 2007 | 11th Bahamian Parliament | Tommy Turnquest | Free National Movement |
| 2012 | 12th Bahamian Parliament | Arnold Forbes | Progressive Liberal Party |
| 2017 | 13th Bahamian Parliament | Marvin Dames | Free National Movement |
| 2021 | 14th Bahamian Parliament | McKell Bonaby | Progressive Liberal Party |
| 2026 | 15th Bahamian Parliament | McKell Bonaby | Progressive Liberal Party |

== Election results ==
2021
| Party | Candidate | Votes | % | ±% |
|---|---|---|---|---|
| PLP | McKell Bonaby | 1,797 | 49.53 | ▲13.53 |
| FNM | Marvin Dames | 1,440 | 39.69 | ▼20.31 |
| COI | Jacqueline Lorene Mckinzie | 255 | 7.03 | |
| DNA | Carnille P. Farquharson | 115 | 3.17 | |
| Independent | Samuel Strachan | 19 | 0.52 | |
| Independent | Stephen Serrette | 2 | 0.06 | |
| Turnout | | 3,628 | 67.88 | |
| PLP gain from FNM | | | | |

== See also ==
- Constituencies of the Bahamas
