= Ja'Ann Major =

Bahamian senator

The Honourable Ja'Ann Major

Senate of The Bahamas
- Incumbent
- Assumed office October 10, 2024

Ja'Ann Michella Major is a Bahamian lawyer and Senator. In October 2024, Major was appointed to the Senate of The Bahamas by Governor General Her Excellency Cynthia A. Pratt acting on the advice of Prime Minister Philip Davis after the resignation of Quinton Lightbourne.
