= Owen C. B. Wells =

Bahamian politician

Member of Parliament for St James
- Incumbent
- Assumed office 12 May 2026
- Preceded by: constituency established

Personal details
- Party: Progressive Liberal Party

Owen C. B. Wells is a Bahamian politician from the Progressive Liberal Party (PLP). He was elected member of the House of Assembly for St James in 2026.

== Biography ==
Wells is an attorney-at-law. In May 2026, he was sworn in as a Minister of State for Health and Wellness.

== See also ==
- 15th Bahamian Parliament
