= North Abaco (Bahamas Parliament constituency) =

Bahamas parliamentary constituency

- Constituency
- North Abaco on a map of the 2021 election
- District: North Abaco
- Electorate: 3,437 (2021); 5,106 (2021)

Current constituency
- Seats: 1
- Party: Progressive Liberal Party
- Member: Kirk Cornish

North Abaco is a parliamentary constituency represented in the House of Assembly of the Bahamas. It elects one member of parliament (MP) using the first past the post electoral system. It has been represented by Kirk Cornish from the Progressive Liberal Party since 2021.

== Geography ==
The constituency comprises the district of North Abaco.

== Members of Parliament ==
Election	Parliament	Candidate	Party
1992	8th Bahamian Parliament	Hubert Ingraham	Free National Movement
1997	9th Bahamian Parliament	Hubert Ingraham	Free National Movement
2002	10th Bahamian Parliament	Hubert Ingraham	Free National Movement
2007	11th Bahamian Parliament	Hubert Ingraham	Free National Movement
2012	12th Bahamian Parliament	Hubert Ingraham	Free National Movement
2012 by-election	12th Bahamian Parliament	Renardo Curry	Progressive Liberal Party
2017	13th Bahamian Parliament	Darren Henfield	Free National Movement
2021	14th Bahamian Parliament	Kirk Cornish	Progressive Liberal Party
2026	15th Bahamian Parliament	Kirk Cornish	Progressive Liberal Party

== Election results ==
2021
Party	Candidate	Votes	%	±%
PLP	Kirk Cornish	1,344	42.18	▼12.29
FNM	Darren Henfield	1,085	34.06	▼23.94
COI	Cay Mills	719	22.57	
Kingdom Government Movement	Renardo Curry	31	0.97	
Righteous Government Movement	Kathleen Knowles-Seymour	7	0.22	
Turnout		3,186	62.40	
PLP gain from FNM				

== See also ==
- Constituencies of the Bahamas
