= Marvin Dames =

Bahamian politician

Member of the Parliament of the Bahamas for Mount Moriah
- In office 10 May 2017 – 16 September 2021
- Preceded by: Arnold Forbes
- Succeeded by: McKell Bonaby

Minister of National Security
- In office 15 May 2017 – 17 September 2021

Personal details
- Party: Free National Movement

Marvin Hanlon Dames is a Bahamian politician from the Free National Movement who served as the Member of Parliament for the Mount Moriah constituency from 2017 to 2021.

== Biography ==
Dames served as Deputy Commissioner of Police and as an officer of the Royal Bahamas Police Force. Dames served as minister of national security under Hubert Minnis. Dames is the FNM candidate in the 2026 Bahamian general election.

== See also ==
- 13th Bahamian Parliament
