= Iram Lewis =

Bahamian sprinter (born 1965)

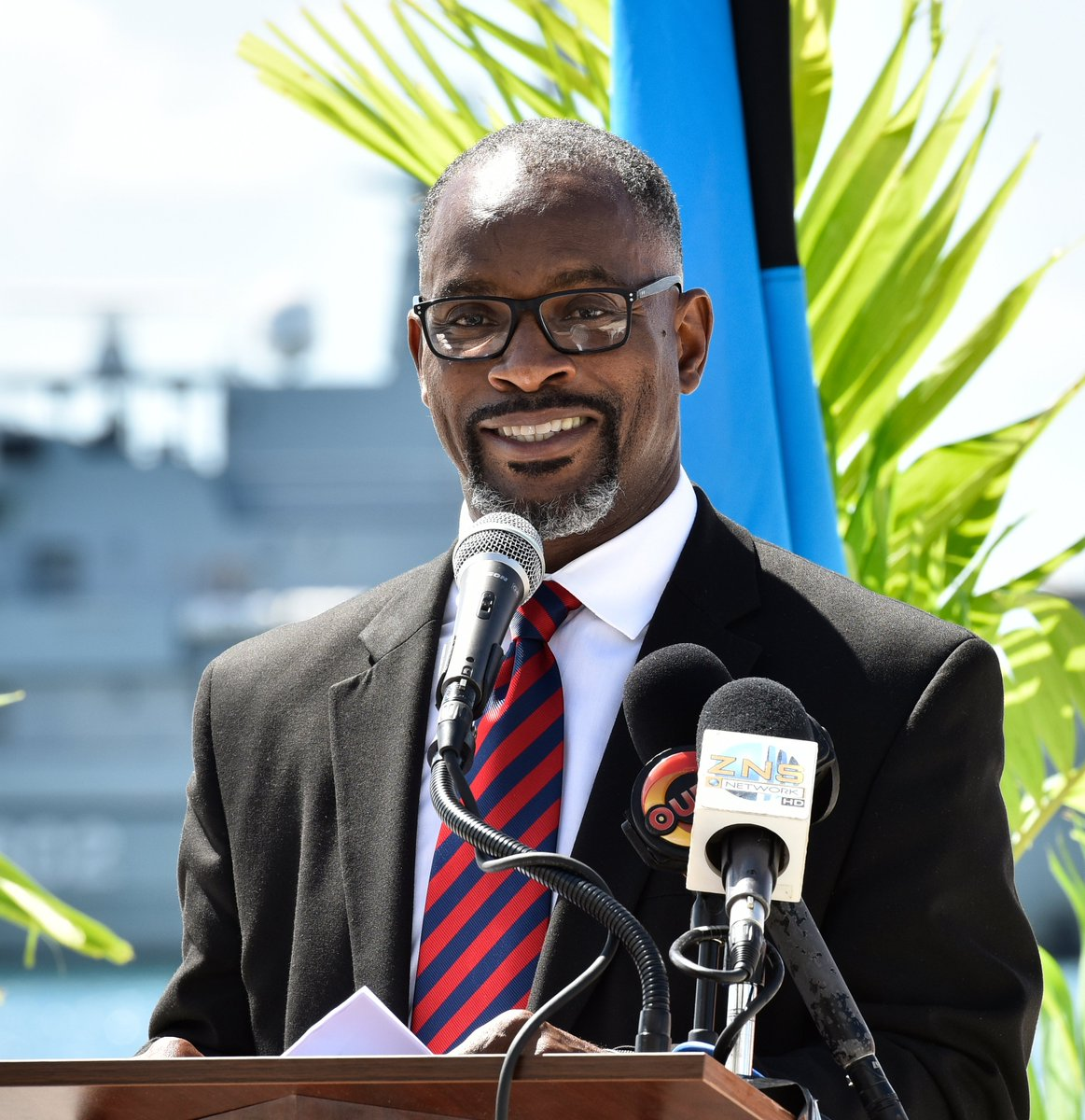
- Lewis in 2020

Minister of Youth, Sports and Culture
- In office March 2021 – September 2021
- Prime Minister: Hubert Minnis
- Preceded by: Lanisha Rolle
- Succeeded by: Mario Bowleg

Member of Parliament for Central Grand Bahama
- In office May 2017 – May 2026
- Preceded by: Neko Grant
- Succeeded by: Frazette Gibson

Personal details
- Born: Iram Dewitt Lewis; 3 May 1965 (age 61) Freeport, Bahamas
- Party: Coalition of Independents (since 2025)
- Other political affiliations: Free National Movement (until 2025)
- Education: College of the Bahamas; Tuskegee University

Iram Dewitt Lewis (born 3 May 1965) is a Bahamian Coalition of Independents politician and former sprinter who was the Member of Parliament (MP) for Central Grand Bahama from 2017-2026. He became the president of the Grand Bahama Amateur Athletic Association in 2015. He was appointed Minister of Youth, Sports and Culture in March 2021.

Before going into politics, Lewis was a sprinter who competed in the 1996 and the 2000 Summer Olympics.

== Early life ==
Lewis was born in Freeport, Grand Bahama. He is the son of the Reverend Aram Lewis. He attended Water Cay All Age School, where he was made Head Boy, and then Freeport High School. He pursued an Associate of Arts at the College of the Bahamas before going on to graduate with a Bachelor of Arts then a graduate degree, Bachelor of Architecture from Tuskegee University.

== Sports career ==
Lewis participated in the 1996 Summer Olympics and the 2000 Summer Olympics as a member of the men's 4 × 100 m relay team. They advanced through their first heat and into the semifinals in 1996 but did not do this in 2000. Lewis' personal best 100m time is 10.20, set in 1988 (Tuskegee University) 9.95 (wind-aided Fl.) 200m 20.64 1998 Nassau.

== Political career ==
On 2 April 2025, Iram Lewis announced his decicision to withdraw from the Free National Movement, citing "an erosion of trust, lack of support, and a sense of unease over the direction his former party has taken as elections draw nearer". He subsequently joined the Coalition of Independents, becoming the first sitting Member of Parliament to represent the party.

== Personal life ==
Lewis lost his son in 2015.
