= Colonial Secretary of the Bahamas =

Government office in the Bahamas

The Colonial Secretary of the Bahama Islands was the second highest official in the colony, usually appointed from Britain. The Colonial Secretary was an ex-officio member of the Executive Council and frequently served as Acting Governor in the absence of the Governor.

In other colonies, the position was sometimes known as Chief Secretary. In the Bahamas, the Colonial Secretary was also known at one time as the Secretary of the Providence. One of the responsibilities of the Secretary of the Providence from 1764 to 1950 was keeper of the public records.

== List of Colonial secretaries of the Bahamas ==
The following is an incomplete list of colonial secretaries of the Bahamas:

Image	Colonial Secretary	Period in Office
	Charles R. Nesbitt	1838-1867
	Charles Lempriere	1867-1868
	George Strahan	1868-1873
	John D'A Dumaresq	1873-1874
	Edward Basnett Anderson Taylor	1875-1891
	Sir Henry Moore Jackson	abt 1891-1894
	Sir George Melville	1894-1895
	John Spencer-Churchill	1895-1905
	William Hart-Bennett	from abt 1911-1914
	Henry E. W. Grant	1918-1923
	Sir Alan Cuthbert Maxwell Burns	1924-1929
	Sir Charles Dundas	1929-1934
	James Henry Jarrett	1935 - unk
	Aubrey Kenneth Solomon	1939
	William L. Heape	1940-1944
	D. G. Stewart	1944-1947
	F. A. Evans	1947-1950
	Charles Percival Bethel	1950-1952
	Anthony Geoffrey Hopwood Gardner-Brown	1952-1955
	Fred A. Noad	1956
	Kenneth M. Walmsley	1956-1964
