= Office of the Attorney-General & Ministry of Legal Affairs (Bahamas) =

Office of the Attorney General & Ministry of Legal Affairs

The Office of the Attorney-General & Ministry of Legal Affairs provides legal advice to the government of the Bahamas in national and international matters.

== List of Attorneys-General of the Colony of the Bahamas ==
This is an incomplete listing of Attorneys-General before 1973.

- William Wylly (1799–1821)
- Bruce Lockhart Burnside (1875–1879)
- William Anthony Musgrave Sheriff (1879–1882)
- William Rees-Davies (c. 1897–1902)
- Frederick Chester Wells-Durrant (1909–1921)
- Herbert Charles Fahie Cox (1925–1929)
- Guy Tracey Watts (1930-c. 1933)
- James Henry Jarrett (1933–1935)
- John Bowes Griffin (1936–1939)
- Ormond H Curry (c 1939)
- Oswald Lawrence Bancroft (1943–1945/6)
- Lionel Alexander William Orr (1955–1963)
- Kendal George Lamon Isaacs (1963–1965)
- William Gordon Bryce QC (c 1967)
- Gerald Collett QC (c. 1970–1973)

== List of Attorneys-General & Ministry of Legal Affairs (Post-Independence in 1973) ==
- Paul Adderley (1973–1989) [1st Attorney General - Post Independence]
- Sean G.A. McWeeney (1989–1992)
- Orville Turnquest (1992–1995)
- Brent Symonette (1995)
- Janet Bostwick (1995–1997) [1st female]
- Tennyson Wells (1997–2001)
- Carl Wilshire Bethel (2001–2002)
- Alfred Sears (2002–2006)
- Allyson Maynard Gibson (2006–2007)
- Claire Hepburn (2007–2008)
- Michael Barnett (2008–2009)
- John Delaney (2009–2012)
- Allyson Maynard Gibson (2012–2017)
- Carl Wilshire Bethel (2017–2021)
- Ryan Pinder (2021–present)

== See also ==
- Justice ministry
- Politics of the Bahamas
