= Hope Strachan =

Bahamian politician (born 1960)

Cynthia Vera Hope Strachan (born 1 December 1960) is a Bahamian Progressive Liberal Party politician who was the Member of Parliament (MP) for Sea Breeze from 2012 to 2017. Strachan served in the Perry Christie cabinet as Minister of Financial Services and Local Government. She also oversaw Trade and Industry.

== Early life and education ==
Hope Strachan was born on the island of New Providence in The Bahamas to Eric and Maxine (Adderley) Ingraham. Strachan was the granddaughter of Mary Naomie Ingraham, who during the 1960s worked to gain suffrage (the right to vote) for Bahamian women.

Strachan obtained an LL.B. (Honours) degree from the University of London, United Kingdom. She was admitted to the Bar of England, Wales, and The Bahamas in 1989.

== Career ==
=== Legal ===
Strachan currently has a civil and commercial law practice under the name Hope Strachan & Co.
