= McKell Bonaby =

Bahamian politician

McKell D. Bonaby

Member of Parliament for Mount Moriah
- Incumbent
- Assumed office 23 September 2021
- Preceded by: Marvin Dames
- Majority: 357 (9.84%)

Personal details
- Party: Progressive Liberal Party

McKell D. Bonaby is a Bahamian Progressive Liberal Party politician serving as the Member of Parliament for the Mount Moriah constituency since 2021.

== Career ==
Prior to being elected to Parliament, Bonaby was an attorney, specializing in civil, commercial, and criminal litigation. He has also volunteered in several roles supporting the PLP since he was 18 years old.

=== Parliament ===
Bonaby was elected in 2021, defeating the Incumbent FNM Member of Parliament Marvin Dames. During his tenure, Bonaby has chaired the Bahamas Public Parks and Beaches Authority.

== Personal life ==
Bonaby is a devout Christian, and he enjoys gardening, basketball, and mixed martial arts (MMA). He is also an avid reader.
