= Southern Shores (Bahamas Parliament constituency) =

Bahamas parliamentary constituency

- Constituency
- Southern Shores is 3 on this map of the 2021 election
- District: New Providence
- Electorate: 3,948 (2011); 5,618 (2021)

Current constituency
- Created: 2012
- Seats: 1
- Party: Progressive Liberal Party
- Member: Obie Roberts

Southern Shores is a parliamentary constituency represented in the House of Assembly of the Bahamas. It elects one member of parliament (MP) using the first past the post electoral system. It has been represented by Leroy Major from the Progressive Liberal Party since 2021.

== Geography ==
The constituency comprises an area on the south coast of New Providence, outside the city of Nassau, the capital and largest city of the Bahamas.

== Members of Parliament ==
Election	Parliament	Candidate	Party
2012	12th Bahamian Parliament	Kendrick Dorsett	Progressive Liberal Party
2017	13th Bahamian Parliament	Frankie Campbell	Free National Movement
2021	14th Bahamian Parliament	Leroy Major	Progressive Liberal Party
2026	15th Bahamian Parliament	Obie Roberts	Progressive Liberal Party

== Election results ==
2021
Party	Candidate	Votes	%	±%
PLP	Leroy Major	2,061	57.04	▲19.04
FNM	Frankie Campbell	1,073	29.70	▼25.30
COI	Ronn Rodgers	331	9.16	
Independent	Livingstone Tynes Jr.	107	2.96	▲1.96
Kingdom Government Movement	Shakantala K. Johnson	31	0.86	
Righteous Government Movement	Whitney Marche	10	0.28	
Turnout		3,613	64.31	
PLP gain from FNM				

== See also ==
- Constituencies of the Bahamas
