= Kirk Cornish =

Bahamian politician

Member of the Parliament of the Bahamas for North Abaco
- Incumbent
- Assumed office 2021

Personal details
- Party: Progressive Liberal Party

Kirk Cornish is a Bahamian politician from the Progressive Liberal Party.

== Career ==
In the 2021 Bahamian general election, he was elected in North Abaco.

In August 2023, he resigned as Parliamentary Secretary in the Office of the Prime Minister.

== Legal problems ==
In 2024, he was accused of rape and in 2024 he was acquitted of all charges. The case went to the Supreme Court of The Bahamas.

== See also ==
- 14th Bahamian Parliament
