= JoBeth Coleby-Davis =

Bahamian politician

Minister of Energy and Transport
- Incumbent
- Assumed office 4 September 2023
- Prime Minister: Philip Davis
- Preceded by: position established

Minister of Transport and Housing
- In office 23 September 2021 – 4 September 2023
- Prime Minister: Philip Davis
- Preceded by: Desmond Bannister
- Succeeded by: Keith Bell (Housing and Urban Renewal)

Member of Parliament for Elizabeth
- Incumbent
- Assumed office 16 September 2021
- Preceded by: Duane Sands
- Majority: 377 (9.74%)

Bahamas Senator
- In office May 2017 – September 2021
- Prime Minister: Hubert Minnis

Personal details
- Born: JoBeth Lillian Coleby; 17 July 1984 (age 42) Freeport, Bahamas
- Party: Progressive Liberal Party
- Spouse: Donavon Davis Jr.
- Children: 1
- Education: College of the Bahamas; Keele University; University of Dundee
- Website: www.jobethforelizabeth.com

JoBeth Lillian Coleby-Davis (born 17 July 1984) is a Bahamian Progressive Liberal Party politician and attorney who has been the Bahamian Minister of Energy and Transport since 4 September 2023 and the Member of Parliament for Elizabeth since 16 September 2021. Coleby-Davis defeated the FNM incumbent Duane Sands in the 2021 general election. She previously served in the Senate from 2017 to 2021.

== Early life and education ==
Coleby-Davis was born in Freeport, Grand Bahama to Irma (née Bootle) and Wayde Coleby. Her family relocated to the United States and then again to the Turks and Caicos where she finished her secondary education at Clement Howell High School. She pursued an Associate Degree in Law and Criminal Justice at the College of the Bahamas. She then took her studies to the United Kingdom, graduating with a dual Bachelor of Laws with Business Management from Keele University in 2009. She took a bar vocational course at Nottingham Trent University the following year before going on to graduate with a Master of Laws in Energy Law and Policy from the University of Dundee.

== Career ==
Coleby-Davis was called to the Bar of England and Wales and the Bar of the Bahamas. She provided legal counsel to ScotiaBank and the Bahamas Petroleum Company, sat on the board Real Property Tax Appeal Tribunal, and participated in the amnesty programme.

Coleby-Davis was appointed and sworn in as a Senator in 2017, when the PLP was in opposition.

=== Parliament ===
In October 2020, she announced she would seek the PLP nomination for the Elizabeth constituency in the next election. She unseated FNM incumbent Duane Sands in the 2021 general election.

After winning the, she was appointed Minister of Transport and Housing under the new prime minister, Philip Davis.

As Minister of Transport and Housing, Coleby-Davis oversaw construction processes of subdivisions in Spring City, Abaco and Carmichael Village. She also worked on addressing the demand for housing in the Young Professionals Prospect Ridge Community. Coleby-Davis's ministry tenure also focused on infrastructure development and public transportation enhancement.

During a Cabinet reshuffle, Coleby-Davis was appointed Minister of Energy and Transport. As minister, she developed a comprehensive plan to tackle the energy crisis, focusing on solar power, grid modernization, and LNG implementation.

== Personal life ==
Coleby-Davis is married to Donovan Davis Jr., an IT specialist. They have a daughter.
