= Coalition of Independents =

- Abbreviation: COI
- Leader: Lincoln Bain
- Deputy Leader: Veronica McIver
- Founded: April 2021; 5 years ago
- Colours: Aquamarine, Gold & Black
- House of Assembly: 0 / 41

Website
- www.coalitionofindependents.com

The Coalition of Independents (abbreviated COI) is a political party in the Bahamas. Lincoln Bain is party leader.

== History ==
Bahamian Evolution was co-founded by Lincoln Bain, Charlotte Green, and Cara Ellis. The organization gained attention through documentaries Bain wrote, produced, and directed. These documentaries sparked widespread discussions about the value and potential of the country's natural resources and sparked public concern.

In March 2021, Bishop Walter Hanchell invited independent candidates and third-party representatives to discuss forming a coalition. The group agreed to collaborate, selecting a name and drafting a mission statement. Bain was elected as the leader. The Coalition of Independents officially launched in April 2021.

In April 2025, COI achieved a significant milestone when Iram Lewis, the Member of Parliament for Central Grand Bahama, announced his decision to withdraw from the Free National Movement (FNM). This move made Lewis the first sitting MP to represent COI. Lewis cited "an erosion of trust, lack of support, and a sense of unease over the direction his former party has taken as elections draw nearer".

== Election results ==
| Election | Party leader | Votes | % | Seats | +/– | Position | Government |
|---|---|---|---|---|---|---|---|
| 2021 | Lincoln Bain | 8,388 | 6.64 | 0 / 39 | New | ▲3rd | Extra-parliamentary |
| 2026 | Lincoln Bain | 17,151 | 12.21 | 0 / 41 | 0 | 3rd | Extra-parliamentary |
