= Ficus cookii =

Scientific classification
- Kingdom: Plantae
- Clade: Embryophytes
- Clade: Tracheophytes
- Clade: Angiosperms
- Clade: Eudicots
- Clade: Rosids
- Order: Rosales
- Family: Moraceae
- Genus: Ficus
- Species: F. cookii

Binomial name
- Ficus cookii Standl.

Species of flowering plant

Ficus cookii is a species of flowering plant in the fig family (Moraceae). It is a tree native to Guatemala and the state of Chiapas in southern Mexico.

The species was described by Paul Carpenter Standley in 1917. It is part of subgenus Spherosuke Raf. sect. Americanae (Miq.) Corner, and is one of five species in the Ficus aurea complex, which also includes F. aurea Nutt., F. isophlebia Standl., F. tecolutensis (Liebm.) Miq., and F. tuerckheimii Standl..
