= Conus honkerorum =

Scientific classification
- Kingdom: Animalia
- Phylum: Mollusca
- Class: Gastropoda
- Subclass: Caenogastropoda
- Order: Neogastropoda
- Superfamily: Conoidea
- Family: Conidae
- Genus: Conus
- Species: C. honkerorum

Binomial name
- Conus honkerorum (Petuch & R. F. Myers, 2014)

Synonyms
- Conus (Dauciconus) honkerorum (Petuch & R. F. Myers, 2014) · accepted, alternate representation; Gradiconus honkerorum Petuch & R. F. Myers, 2014 (original combination)

Species of sea snail

Conus honkerorum is a species of sea snail, a marine gastropod mollusc in the family Conidae, the cone snails, cone shells or cones.

These snails are predatory and venomous. They are capable of stinging humans.

== Description ==
The size of the shell attains 20 mm.

== Distribution ==
This marine species occurs from the southern islands of the Bimini chain to the Bahamas.
