= Bimini and Berry Islands =

Bahamas parliamentary constituency

- Constituency for the House of Assembly
- District: Bimini and the Berry Islands
- Electorate: 2,253 (2025)
- Major settlements: Alice Town, Bailey Town, Great Harbour Cay

Current constituency
- Created: 2026
- Seats: 1
- Party: Progressive Liberal Party
- Member: Randy Rolle

Bimini and Berry Islands is a parliamentary constituency represented in the House of Assembly of the Bahamas. It elects one member of parliament (MP) using the first-past-the-post voting system. The constituency was created for the 2026 Bahamian general election and has been represented since then by Randy Rolle of the Progressive Liberal Party (PLP).

The constituency was created in 2026 after the Constituency Boundaries Commission recommended two new seats as part of a redistribution intended to address population shifts and voter parity.

== History ==
In October 2025, the Boundaries Commission was considering creating new constituencies by dividing the existing West Grand Bahama and Bimini seat, citing the size of the electorate and Bimini's population growth. The combined West Grand Bahama and Bimini constituency had been criticised by residents for pairing islands with different priorities.

In its report dated 29 December 2025, the Constituencies Commission said the new seat was formed from areas that had previously been part of the West Grand Bahama and Bimini constituency and the North Andros and Berry Islands constituency. The report also said that no public consultations or meetings were held during the commission's work.

Ahead of the 2026 election, the commission was also reported to be considering combining Bimini with the Berry Islands into a new constituency as part of a broader review aimed at a fairer distribution of voters, with reference to constitutional requirements on population-based boundaries. On 8 January 2026, the commission's report was tabled in Parliament, confirming the creation of a separate Bimini and Berry Islands seat and increasing the number of constituencies from 39 to 41.

The report's annexes specified that the Berry Islands would be transferred from the North Andros and the Berry Islands constituency and that Polling Divisions 8, 9, 10 and 11 would be moved from the West Grand Bahama and Bimini constituency into the new seat.

Residents in Bimini welcomed the creation of a separate seat, saying the island had often felt overlooked within the former combined constituency.

The new boundaries were formalised in the House of Assembly Revision of Boundaries and Re-distribution of Seats Order, 2026 (S.I. No. 5 of 2026), which came into force on 16 January 2026 and applies from the next general election. The order also provides that it does not affect any election until a proclamation is made appointing the date for the next general election. The constituency was first contested at the 2026 general election, when PLP candidate Randy Rolle defeated Free National Movement candidate Carlton Bowleg.

== Geography ==
Under the 2026 boundaries order, the constituency includes North and South Bimini (including Alice Town and Bailey Town) and surrounding rocks and cays (including Alec Cay, Gun Cay, North Cat Cay, South Cat Cay and Ocean Cay), as well as the Berry Islands group of cays (including Great Harbour Cay, Chub Cay and Great Stirrup Cay) and other surrounding rocks and cays within a fifteen-mile radius of Great Harbour Cay.

== Demographics ==
The constituency combines two Bahamian districts. At the 2022 census, Bimini had a population of 2,361 and the Berry Islands had a population of 1,002.

The proposed constituency was reported to have 2,253 registered voters. The commission's summary tables listed 2,057 registered voters for the area in 2021 and 2,253 in 2025, across five polling divisions.

== Members of Parliament ==
Election	Parliament	Member	Party
2026	15th	Randy Rolle	PLP

== Elections ==
The constituency was first contested at the 2026 general election.

In February 2026, the Progressive Liberal Party ratified senator Randy Rolle as its candidate for the constituency. The Free National Movement listed Carlton Bowleg as its candidate.

In February 2026, the Coalition of Independents said it had ratified Hyram Rolle as its candidate for the constituency.

=== 2026 general election ===
Randy Rolle won the seat for the PLP, defeating Carlton Bowleg by 211 votes according to unofficial results published by BahamasLocal.

General Election 2026: Bimini and Berry Islands
Party	Candidate	Votes	%	±%
PLP	Randy Rolle	947	51.98	New
FNM	Carlton Bowleg	736	40.40	New
COI	Hyram Rolle	134	7.35	New
Independent	Paul Rolle	5	0.27	New
Turnout		1,822		

== See also ==
- List of National Assembly constituencies of The Bahamas
