= Porgy Bay =

Town in Biminis, Bahamas

- Town
- Location within Bahamas
- Coordinates: 25.74332°N 79.28669°W
- Country: Bahamas
- Island: Biminis
- Time zone: UTC-5 (Eastern Time Zone)
- Area code: 242

Porgy Bay is a fishing village in the Bahamas located on North Bimini island.

== Etymology ==
The town name refers to the Pluma porgy, a species of fish found in the Caribbean.

== Governance ==
For elections to the Parliament of the Bahamas, Porgy Bay is part of the Bimini and Berry Islands constituency.
