= Compleat Angler Hotel =

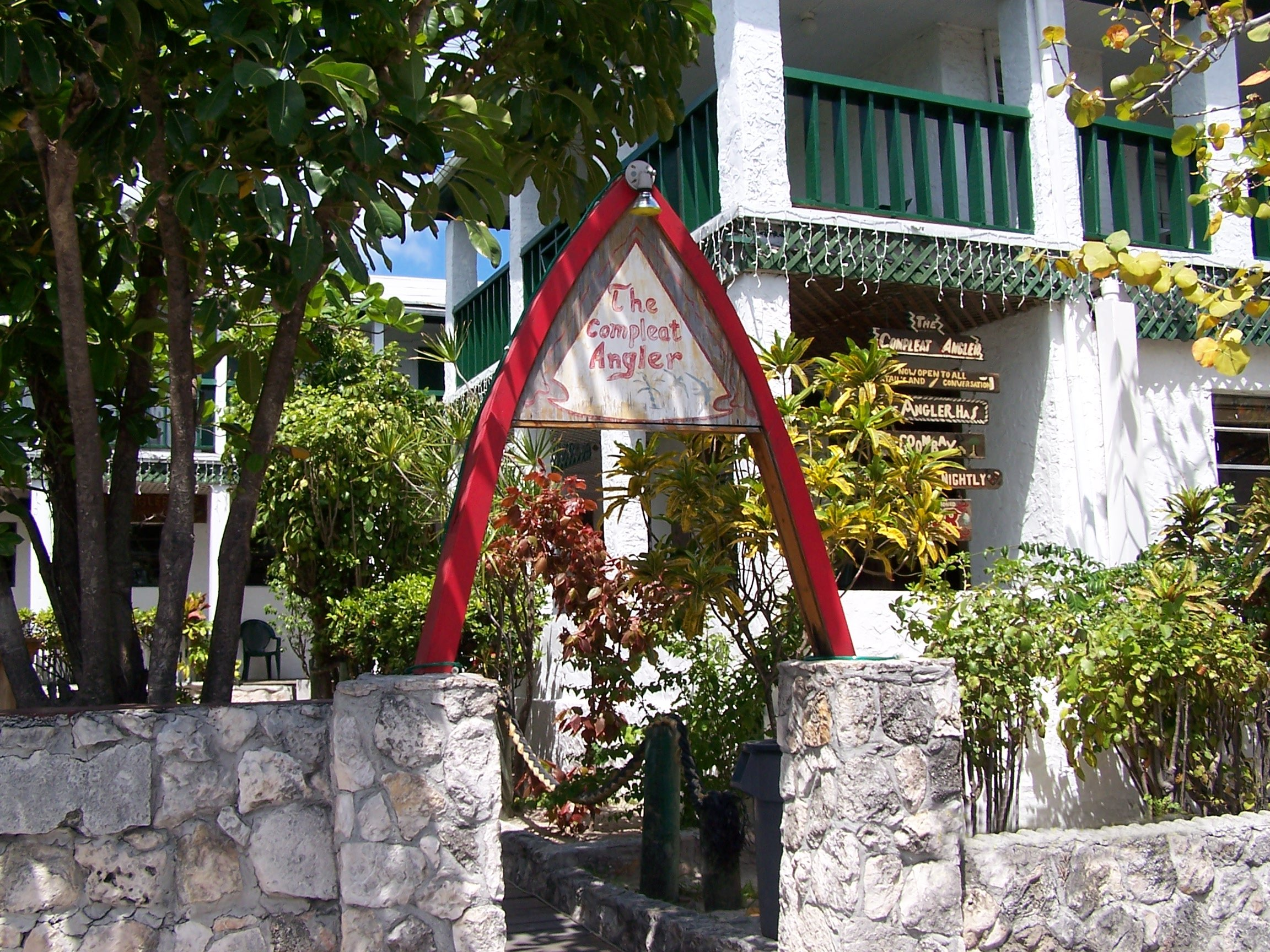
- An outdoor sign at the Compleat Angler Hotel
- Interactive map of the Compleat Angler Hotel area

General information
- Status: Demolished
- Type: Hotel
- Location: Alice Town; Bahamas
- Coordinates: 25°43′30″N 79°17′54.31″W
- Completed: 1935
- Demolished: 2006

The Compleat Angler Hotel was a modest three-story hotel on the island of North Bimini in the Bahamas. The establishment, located in the center of Alice Town, contained 12 guestrooms in addition to its rowdy bar. It is notable for its association with Ernest Hemingway, who was a guest from 1935 to 1937 and is said to have worked on his 1937 novel To Have and Have Not there.

== History ==
It was built by Henry and Helen Duncombe in 1935 following the destruction by fire of their first house, named The Dower House, on 18 November 1934. The hotel was damaged in a 1936 hurricane but quickly repaired. Duncombe was the island's commissioner during the American Prohibition Era. Henry Duncombe died in 1949, but the hotel continued under the proprietorship of Helen Duncombe until she retired and sold the hotel to the Brown family in 1973.

The hotel later became a significant tourist attraction for Bimini and housed a collection of Hemingway memorabilia, including signed copies of his work and numerous photographs. Generations of anglers followed in the novelist's wake to crack open a beer and play a game of ring toss after a long day on the water. The Angler was an unofficial museum, with one room devoted to Hemingway's exploits and most of its pine walls decorated with decades' worth of fading photos and news clips of assorted anglers and trophy fish. During its existence, the hotel hosted live music and served food.

The hotel is separate from The Compleat Angler Hotel in Marlow, Buckinghamshire. Both hotels derive their name from the 1653 Izaak Walton book.

== Fire ==
On January 13, 2006, the hotel was destroyed by a fire. The owner, Julian Brown, perished in the blaze after leading a guest to safety.

== Notable guests ==
In addition to Ernest Hemingway, notable visitors have included Lucille Ball, singer and writer Jimmy Buffett, and Colorado senator Gary Hart, whose presidential aspirations collapsed in 1987 when compromising photographs were released of him at the lodge with Donna Rice, a woman who was not his wife.
