= Ficus tuerckheimii =

Scientific classification
- Kingdom: Plantae
- Clade: Embryophytes
- Clade: Tracheophytes
- Clade: Angiosperms
- Clade: Eudicots
- Clade: Rosids
- Order: Rosales
- Family: Moraceae
- Genus: Ficus
- Species: F. tuerckheimii

Binomial name
- Ficus tuerckheimii Standl.

Species of flowering plant

Ficus tuerckheimii is a species of flowering plant in the fig family (Moraceae). It is a tree native to eastern, central, and southern Mexico and to Guatemala, Nicaragua, Costa Rica, and Panama in Central America. It is likely pollinated by wasps of genus Pegoscapus in family Agaonidae.

The species was described by Paul Carpenter Standley in 1917. It is part of subgenus Spherosuke Raf. sect. Americanae (Miq.) Corner, and is one of five species in the Ficus aurea complex, which also includes F. aurea Nutt., F. cookii Standl., F. isophlebia Standl., and F. tecolutensis (Liebm.) Miq..
