= Carlton Bowleg =

Bahamian politician

Member of the Parliament of the Bahamas for North Andros and Berry Islands
- In office 10 May 2017 – 16 September 2021
- Preceded by: Perry Gomez
- Succeeded by: Leonardo Lightbourne

Personal details
- Born: Andros, The Bahamas
- Party: Free National Movement
- Website: Official website

Carlton Bowleg Jr. is a Bahamian politician from the Free National Movement who served as the Member of Parliament for the North Andros and Berry Islands constituency from 2017 to 2021.

== Early life ==
Bowleg was born and raised in Andros and was educated at Mastic Point All Age School and North Andros High School. He was born as one of nine children to Carlton Lewis Bowleg Sr and his wife Mary Bowleg.

== Biography ==
In the 2017 Bahamian general election, Bowleg was elected MP for North Andros and Berry Islands. Bowleg served as Parliamentary Secretary in the Ministry of Agriculture and Marine Resources under Hubert Minnis. In 2025, applied to be a candidate for the next general election. Bowleg and Randy Rolle applied for Bimini and Berry Island. Bowleg is the FNM candidate for Bimini and Berry Islands in the 2026 Bahamian general election.

== Personal life ==
In August 2021, Bowleg was injured in a car accident.

== See also ==
- 13th Bahamian Parliament
