= Ficus tecolutensis =

Scientific classification
- Kingdom: Plantae
- Clade: Embryophytes
- Clade: Tracheophytes
- Clade: Angiosperms
- Clade: Eudicots
- Clade: Rosids
- Order: Rosales
- Family: Moraceae
- Genus: Ficus
- Species: F. tecolutensis

Binomial name
- Ficus tecolutensis (Liebm.) Miq.

Synonyms
- Ficus rzedowskiana Carvajal & Cuevas-Figueroa; Urostigma tecolutense Liebm.

Species of flowering plant

Ficus tecolutensis is a species of flowering plant in the fig family (Moraceae). It is a tree native to central, eastern, and southern Mexico and to Guatemala, El Salvador, Honduras, and Nicaragua in Central America.

The species was first described as Urostigma tecolutense by Frederik Liebmann in 1851. In 1867 Friedrich Anton Wilhelm Miquel placed the species in genus Ficus as F. tecolutensis. It is part of subgenus Spherosuke Raf. sect. Americanae (Miq.) Corner, and is one of five species in the Ficus aurea complex, which also includes F. aurea Nutt., F. cookii Standl., F. isophlebia Standl., and F. tuerckheimii Standl..
