= Perry Gomez =

Bahamian politician (1947–2023)

Michael Perry Gomez
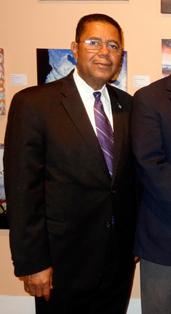
- Gomez in 2013

Minister of Health
- In office 12 May 2012 – 11 May 2017
- Prime Minister: Perry Christie
- Preceded by: Hubert Minnis
- Succeeded by: Duane Sands

Member of the House of Assembly of the Bahamas for North Andros and Berry Islands
- In office 12 May 2012 – 11 May 2017
- Preceded by: Vincent Peet
- Succeeded by: Carlton Bowleg Jr.

Personal details
- Born: 18 January 1947 New Providence, Bahamas
- Died: 21 October 2023 (aged 76)
- Party: Progressive Liberal Party

Michael Perry Gomez (18 January 1947 – 21 October 2023) was a Bahamian politician, who served as Minister of Health and as member for North Andros and Berry Islands in the House of Assembly of the Bahamas. First elected to the legislature in the 2012 election after defeating Education Minister Desmond Bannister by a margin of 24 votes, he was appointed by Prime Minister Perry Christie to be Minister of Health.

== Early life ==
Gomez was born on New Providence and graduated from the University of the West Indies with a degree in medicine in 1971. He then attended medical school at Wayne State University where he specialized in Internal Medicine and Infectious Diseases.

== Career ==
Gomez was known globally for his work on HIV/AIDS research, being the founder and director of the National HIV Programme of the Bahamas. Under his direction, the Programme had a major impact on decreasing the spread of the disease. HIV transmission rates in the Bahamas declined by more than 30 percent and HIV transmission from mother-to-child also decreased dramatically. Seventy-two percent of all persons with advanced HIV receive requisite treatment and all persons with HIV and TB co-infection receive full treatment for both conditions.

== Death ==
Perry Gomez died on 21 October 2023, at the age of 76.

== Electoral history ==
General Election 2012: North Andros and Berry Islands
Party	Candidate	Votes	%	±%
PLP	Perry Gomez	1,192	48.75	−4.92
FNM	Desmond Bannister	1,168	47.77	+1.44
Democratic National Alliance	Randy Butler	85	3.48	+3.48
Majority		24	0.98	−6.37
Turnout		2,445	93.53	
PLP hold		Swing	-6.37	
