= Bimini Island Air =

US airline

Bimini Island Air, Inc
IATA	ICAO	Call sign
—	BMY	BIMINI
- Founded: 1993
- Ceased operations: July 1, 2011
- Hubs: Fort Lauderdale Executive Airport
- Focus cities: South Bimini Airport
- Fleet size: 1 (at the time of closure)
- Headquarters: Fort Lauderdale, Florida, United States
- Key people: Michael J. Kelly (President & CEO)
- Website: www.flybias.com

Bimini Island Air was a part 135 shared charter operator with its headquarters in unincorporated Broward County, Florida, near Fort Lauderdale. Operating out of Fort Lauderdale, Bimini Island Air flew to various islands in the Bahamas including Bimini, Marsh Harbour, Treasure Cay and Freeport. Bimini Island Air focus cities were Bimini and Marsh Harbour. Its FAA operating certificate was revoked by the FAA in 2011 (15 years ago).

The former Bimini Island Air facility is now occupied by Creston Aviation.

== Destinations ==
Bahamas

- Bimini
- Marsh Harbour
- Treasure Cay
- North Eleuthera
- Freeport
- Nassau
- San Salvador

Florida

- Key West
- Ft. Lauderdale International
- Ft. Lauderdale Executive
- Miami
- Orlando

== Fleet ==
The Bimini Island Air fleet consisted of a single aircraft on April 7, 2011. As of September 22, 2011 it had been repossessed by the leasing company.

Bimini Island Air Fleet
Aircraft	Total	Passengers (economy)	Routes	Notes
Saab 340B	1	30	All	Twin engine turboprop with two pilots and one flight attendant.

== See also ==
- List of defunct airlines of the United States
