= Leonardo Lightbourne =

Bahamian politician

Member of the Parliament of the Bahamas for North Andros North Andros and Berry Islands (2021–2026)
- Incumbent
- Assumed office 16 September 2021
- Preceded by: Carlton Bowleg Jr.

Personal details
- Party: Progressive Liberal Party
- Education: Liberty University

Leonardo "Leo" D. Lightbourne is a Bahamian politician from the Progressive Liberal Party.

== Education ==
Lightbourne attended Mangrove Cay High School and Marshalltown Community College in Marshalltown, Iowa. He then earned a full basketball scholarship to Liberty University in Lynchburg, Virginia, and played on the school's NCAA (National Collegiate Athletic Association) Division I team.

== Career ==
Before entering politics, he was an elite basketball player and businessman. In the 2021 Bahamian general election, he was elected in North Andros and Berry Islands.

In the 2026 Bahamian general election, Lightbourne was a candidate in the newly created North Andros constituency.

== See also ==
- 14th Bahamian Parliament
