= Pegoscapus mexicanus =

Scientific classification
- Domain: Eukaryota
- Kingdom: Animalia
- Phylum: Arthropoda
- Class: Insecta
- Order: Hymenoptera
- Family: Agaonidae
- Genus: Pegoscapus
- Species: P. mexicanus

Binomial name
- Pegoscapus mexicanus (Ashmead, 1904)

Species of wasp

Pegoscapus mexicanus is a species of fig wasp which is native to Florida, the Caribbean, Mexico and Central America. It has an obligate mutualism with Ficus aurea, the fig species it pollinates.
