= North Andros (Bahamas Parliament constituency) =

Bahamas parliamentary constituency

- Constituency
- District: North Andros
- Major settlements: Nicholls Town, Stafford Creek

Current constituency
- Created: 2026
- Seats: 1
- Member: Vacant

North Andros is a parliamentary constituency that is represented in the House of Assembly of the Bahamas. It elected one member of parliament (MP) using the first-past-the-post voting system for the first time at the 2026 Bahamian general election.

== History ==
In October 2025, Bahamian media reported that the Boundaries Commission was considering creating new constituencies by dividing the existing North Andros and Berry Islands seat, citing the size of its electorate. Leonardo Lightbourne was a candidate in 2026.

== Members ==
Election	Parliament	Candidate	Party	Ref.
2026	15th Bahamian Parliament	Leonardo Lightbourne	PLP	

== See also ==
- List of National Assembly constituencies of The Bahamas
