= Ficus isophlebia =

Scientific classification
- Kingdom: Plantae
- Clade: Embryophytes
- Clade: Tracheophytes
- Clade: Angiosperms
- Clade: Eudicots
- Clade: Rosids
- Order: Rosales
- Family: Moraceae
- Genus: Ficus
- Species: F. isophlebia

Binomial name
- Ficus isophlebia Standl.

Species of flowering plant

Ficus isophlebia is a species of flowering plant in the fig family (Moraceae). It is a tree native to Central America and southern Mexico.

The species was described by Paul Carpenter Standley in 1917. It is part of subgenus Spherosuke Raf. sect. Americanae (Miq.) Corner, and is one of five species in the Ficus aurea complex, which also includes F. aurea Nutt., F. cookii Standl., F. tecolutensis (Liebm.) Miq., and F. tuerckheimii Standl..
