= Randy Rolle =

Bahamian politician

Member of Parliament for Bimini & The Berry Islands
- Incumbent
- Assumed office May 12, 2026

Personal details
- Party: Progressive Liberal Party

Randy Rolle is a Bahamian politician from the Progressive Liberal Party (PLP).

== Early life ==
Rolle's family comes from Bimini.

== Career ==
Randy Rolle served in 2012 - 2017 as a Diplomat Consul General to Atlanta. In 2021 to 2026 he served as Government Senator. He was appointed to the Bahamian Senate by Prime Minister Philip Davis

Rolle is Chairman of the Consumer Protection Commission. Rolle is the PLP candidate for Bimini and Berry Islands in the 2026 Bahamian general election.

In the 2026 Bahamian General Election he was elected as the Progressive Liberal Party Member of Parliament for the newly created Bimini and Berry Island Constituency.
