= Bailey Town =

Town in Biminis, Bahamas

- Town
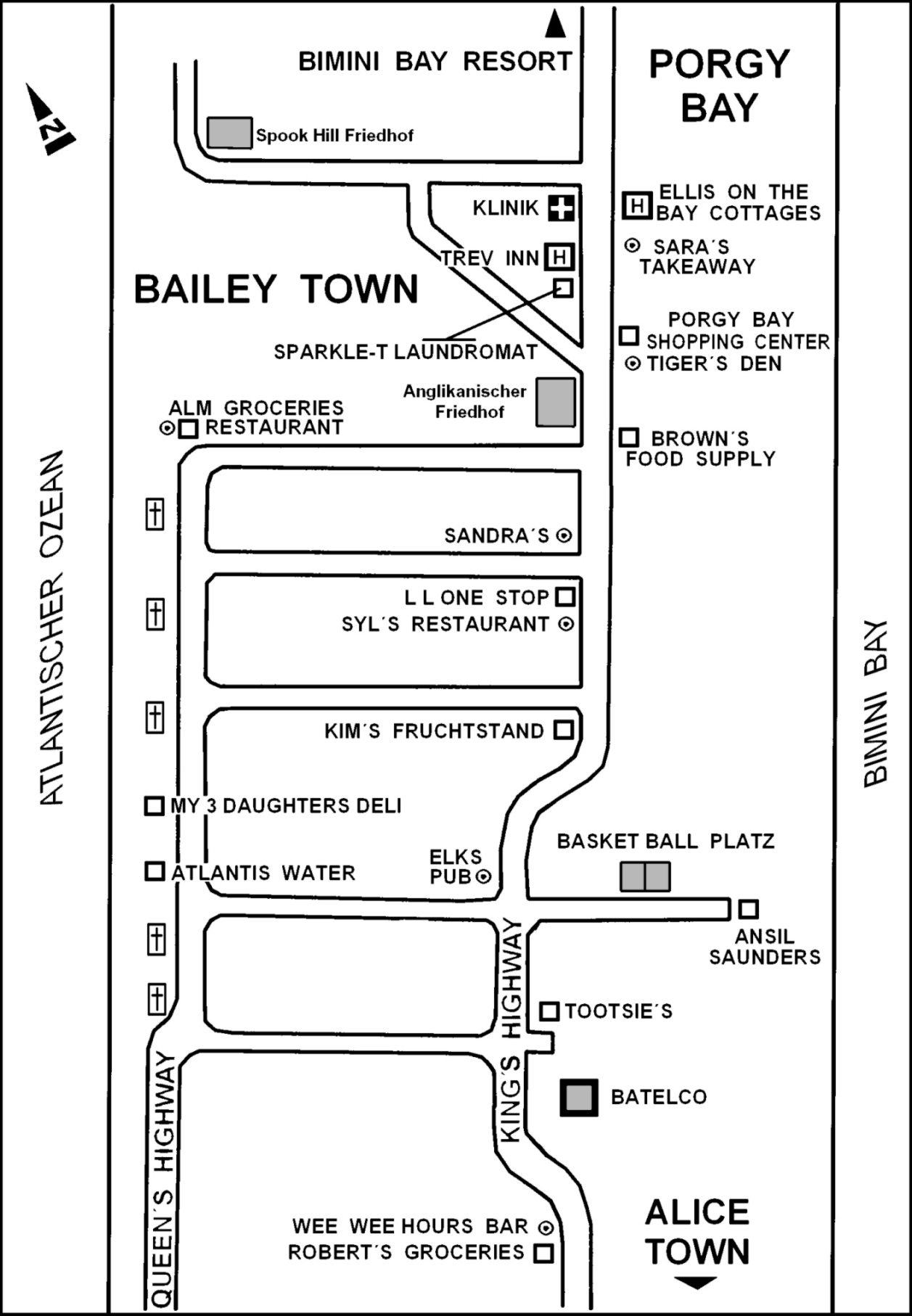
- Road map of Bailey Town

- Location within Bahamas
- Coordinates: 25.74332°N 79.28669°W
- Country: Bahamas
- Island: Biminis
- Time zone: UTC-5 (Eastern Time Zone)
- Area code: 242

Bailey Town is a town in the Bahamas located on North Bimini island.

== Governance ==
For elections to the Parliament of the Bahamas, Bailey Town is part of the Bimini and Berry Islands constituency.
