= North Andros and Berry Islands =

Bahamas parliamentary constituency

- Former constituency
- North Andros and Berry Islands on a map of the 2021 election
- District: North Andros and the Berry Islands
- Electorate: 1,980 (2011); 2,726 (2021)

Former constituency
- Abolished: 2026
- Seats: 1
- Replaced by: Bimini and Berry Islands, North Andros

North Andros and Berry Islands was a parliamentary constituency represented in the House of Assembly of The Bahamas. It elected one member of parliament (MP) using the first past the post electoral system. It was represented by Leonardo Lightbourne from the Progressive Liberal Party from 2021 to 2026.

== History ==
In October 2025, the Boundaries Commission was considering creating new constituencies by dividing the existing West Grand Bahama and Bimini seat, citing the size of the electorate and Bimini's population growth. The combined West Grand Bahama and Bimini constituency had been criticised by residents for pairing islands with different priorities.

In its report dated 29 December 2025, the Constituencies Commission said the new seat was formed from areas that had previously been part of the West Grand Bahama and Bimini constituency and the North Andros and Berry Islands constituency. The report also said that no public consultations or meetings were held during the commission's work.

Ahead of the 2026 election, the commission was also reported to be considering combining Bimini with the Berry Islands into a new constituency as part of a broader review aimed at a fairer distribution of voters, with reference to constitutional requirements on population-based boundaries. On 8 January 2026, the commission's report was tabled in Parliament, confirming the creation of a separate Bimini and Berry Islands seat and increasing the number of constituencies from 39 to 41. The constituency was replaced by North Andros.

== Geography ==
The constituency comprises the districts of North Andros and the Berry Islands.

== Members of Parliament ==
Election	Parliament	Candidate	Party	Ref.
2002	10th Bahamian Parliament	Vincent Peet	PLP	
2007	11th Bahamian Parliament	Vincent Peet	PLP	
2012	12th Bahamian Parliament	Perry Gomez	PLP	
2017	13th Bahamian Parliament	Carlton Bowleg Jr.	FNM	
2021	14th Bahamian Parliament	Leonardo Lightbourne	PLP	

== Elections ==
General Election 2012: North Andros and Berry Islands
Party	Candidate	Votes	%	±%
PLP	Perry Gomez	1,192	48.75	−4.92
FNM	Desmond Bannister	1,168	47.77	+1.44
Democratic National Alliance	Randy Butler	85	3.48	+3.48
Majority		24	0.98	−6.37
Turnout		2,445	93.53	
PLP hold		Swing	-6.37	

== See also ==
- Constituencies of The Bahamas
