= Alice Town =

Town in Biminis, Bahamas

- Town
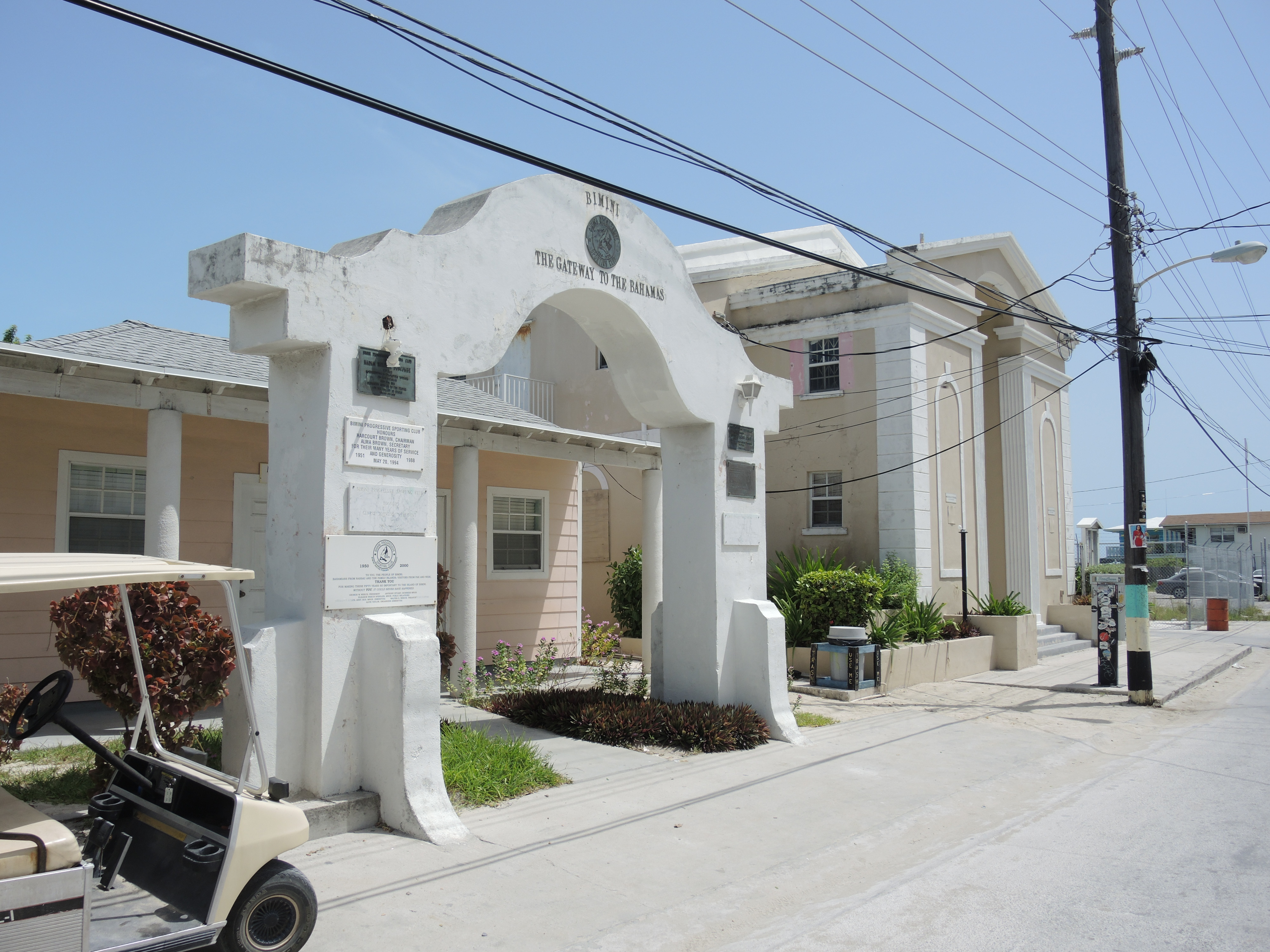
- Public offices

- Location within Bahamas
- Coordinates: 25.727694°N 79.2976°W
- Country: Bahamas
- Island: Biminis

Population (2010)
  - Total: 300
- Time zone: UTC-5 (Eastern Time Zone)
- Area code: 242

Alice Town is a town in the Bahamas. It is located on North Bimini island and the population is 300 as of the 2010 census.

Alice Town is the centre of the tourist trade on Bimini: there are several hotels, bars and restaurants. North of Alice Town is the main settlement (where most islanders live) called Bailey Town. To the north of Bailey Town is Porgy Bay.

== Transportation ==
The town is served by South Bimini Airport on nearby South Bimini.

== Gallery ==
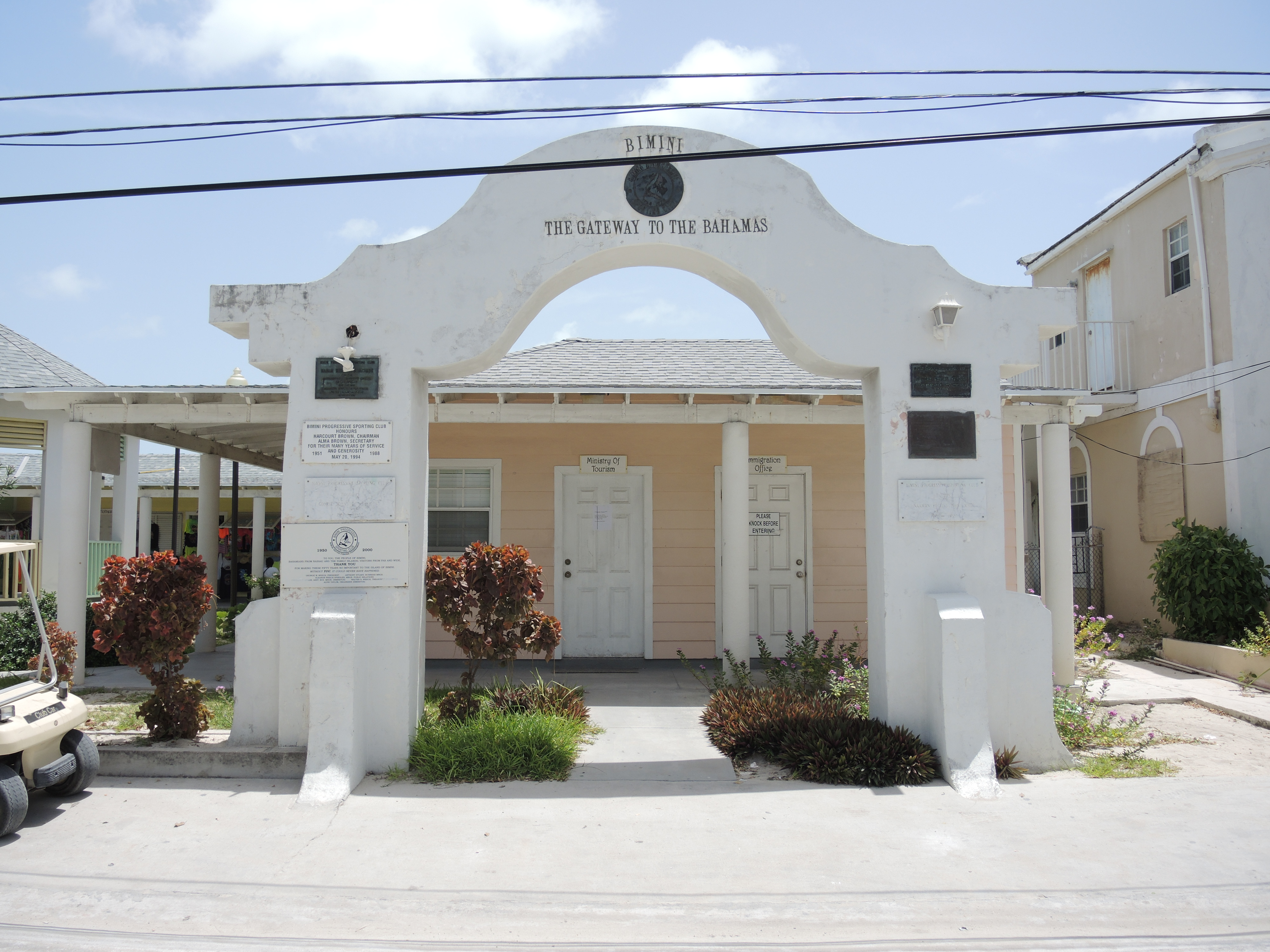
Ministry of Tourism

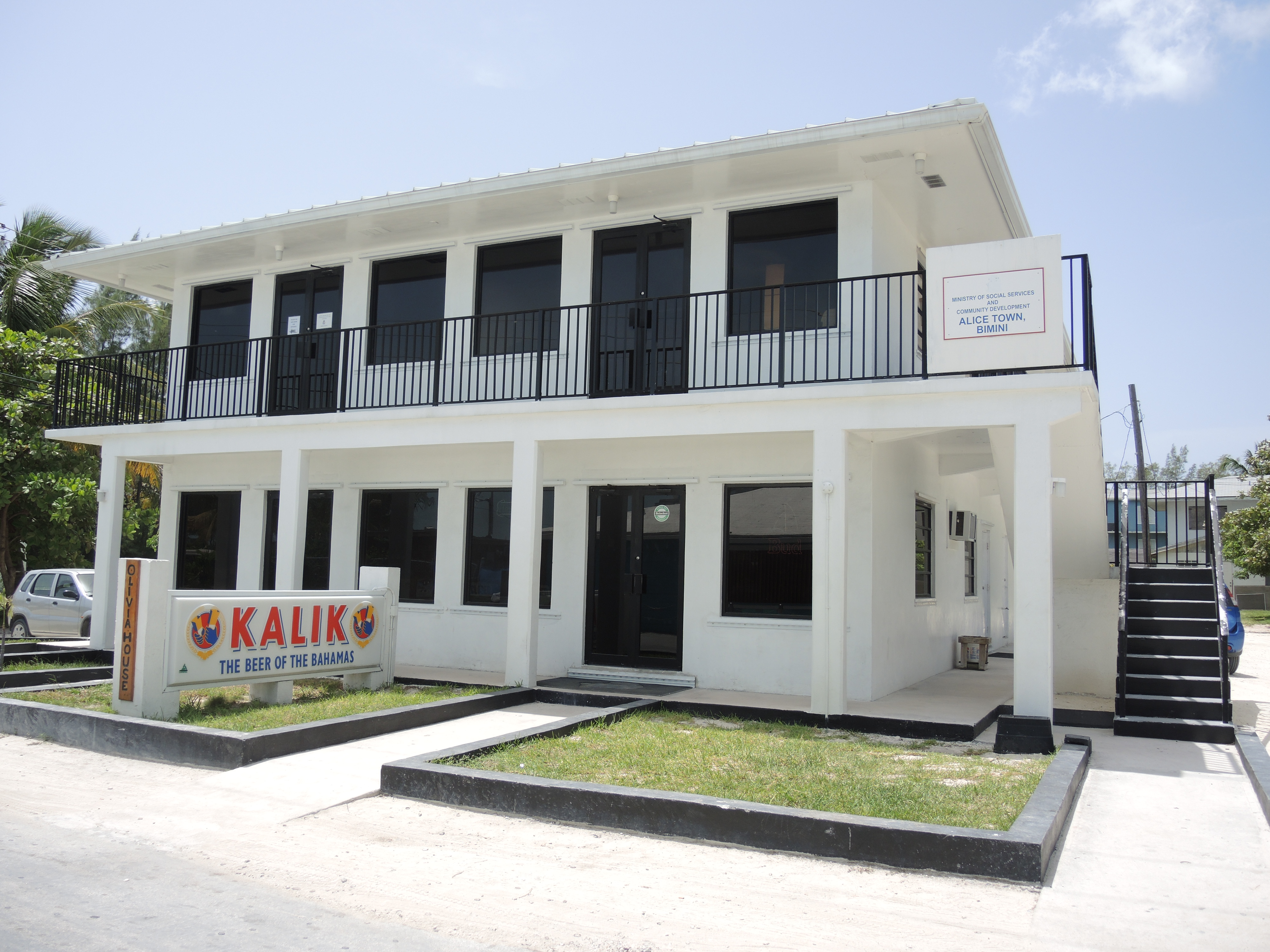
Ministry of Social Services and Community Development

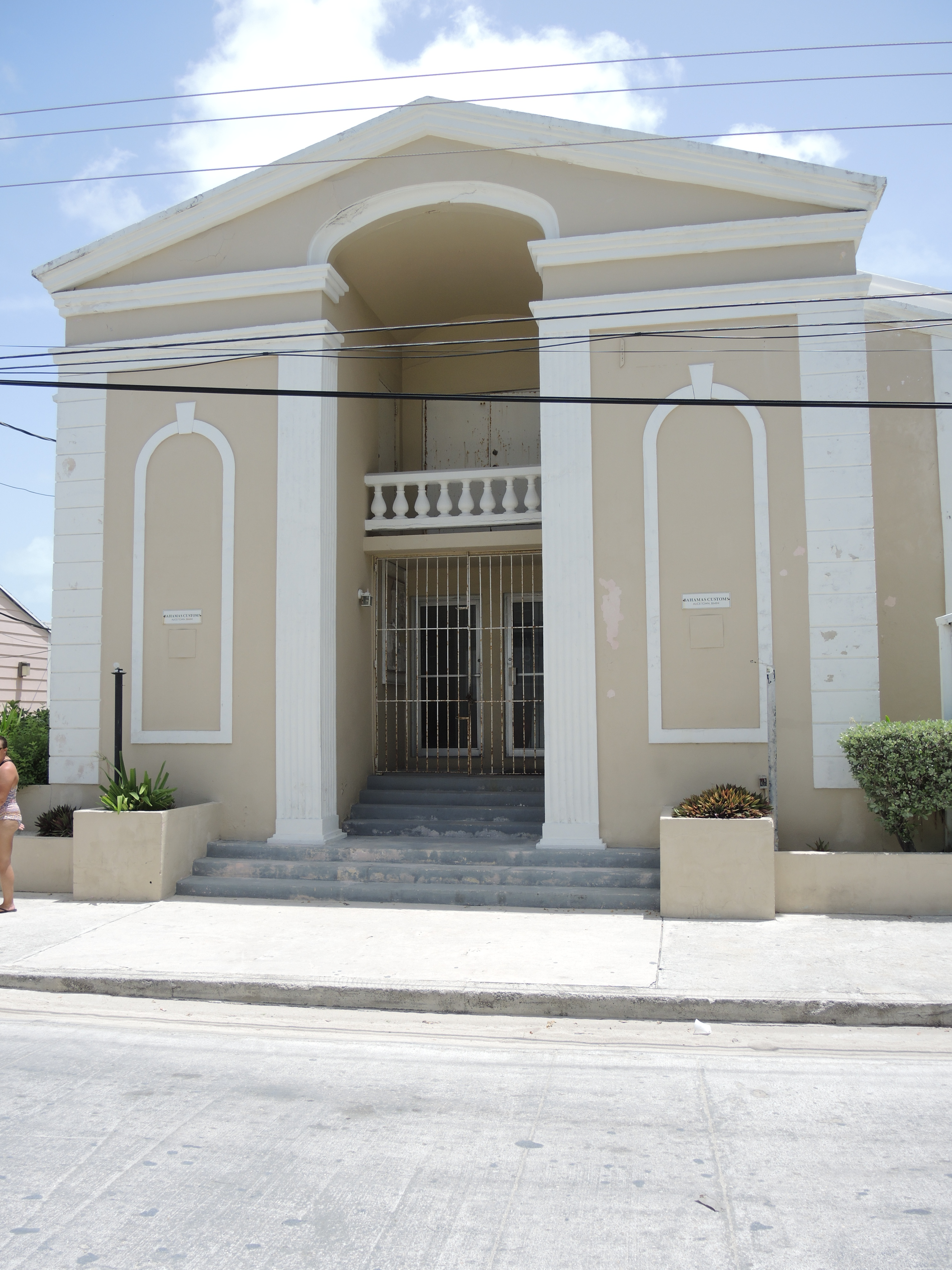
Customs

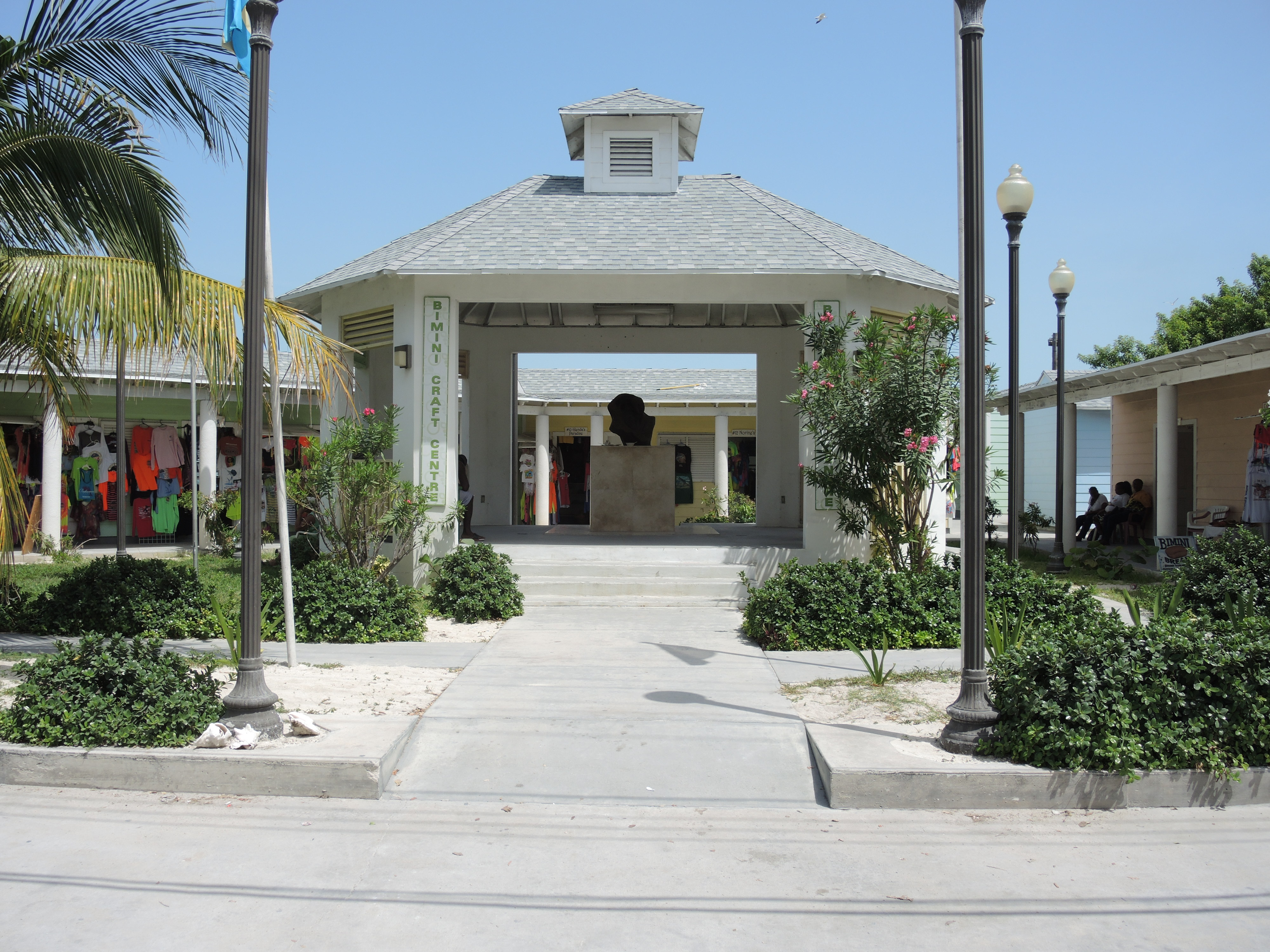
Craft centre

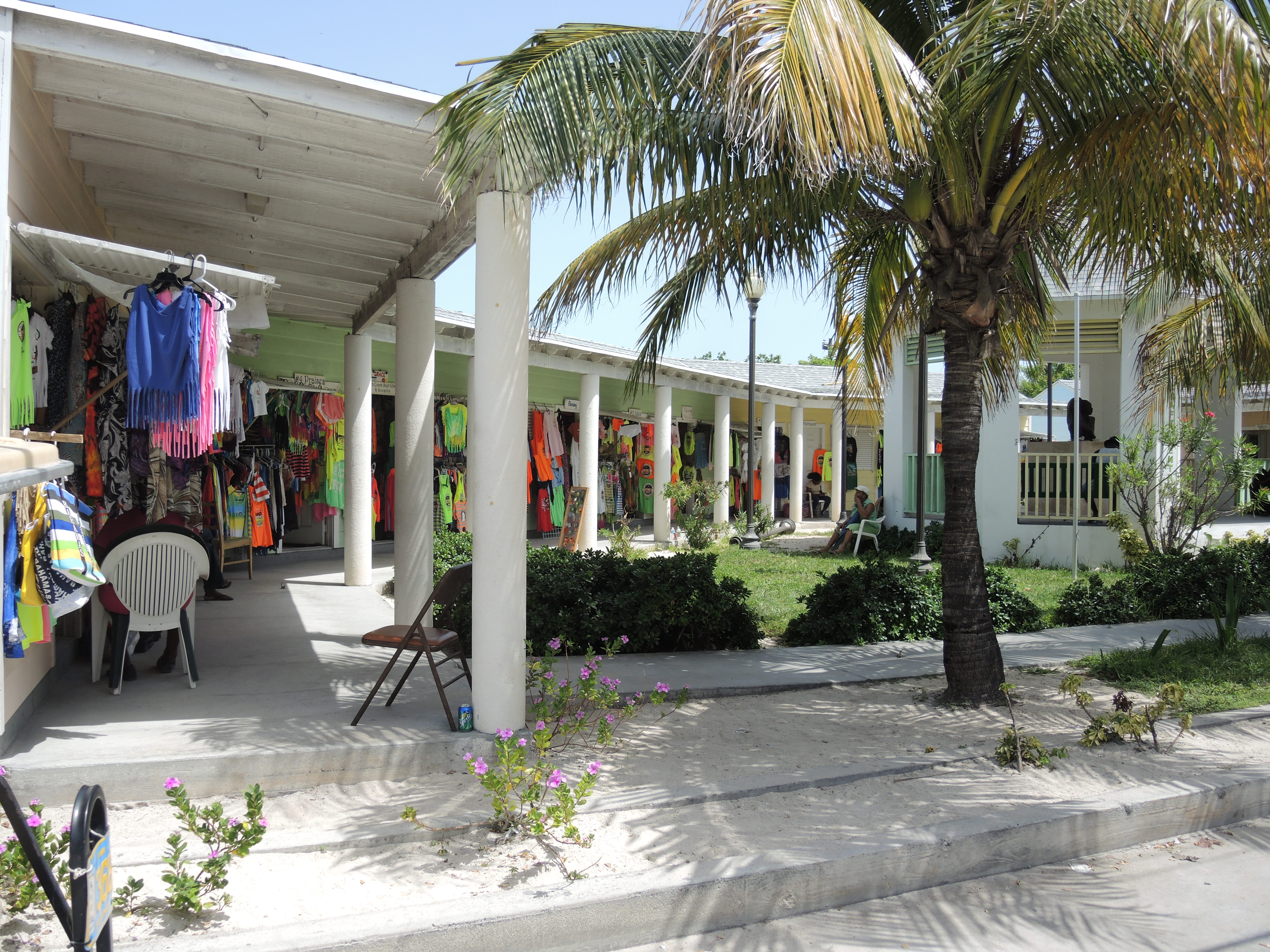
Shops

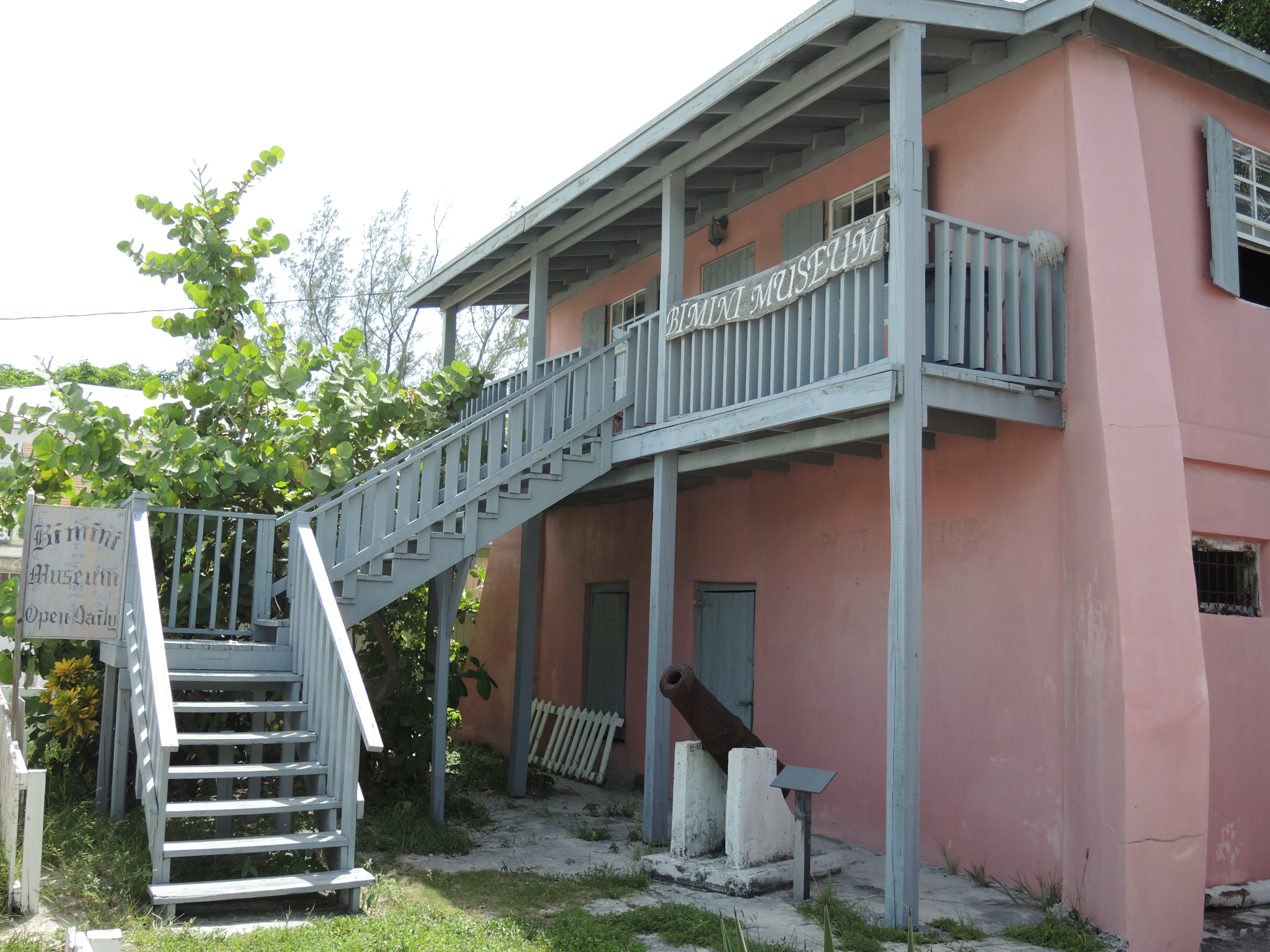
Museum

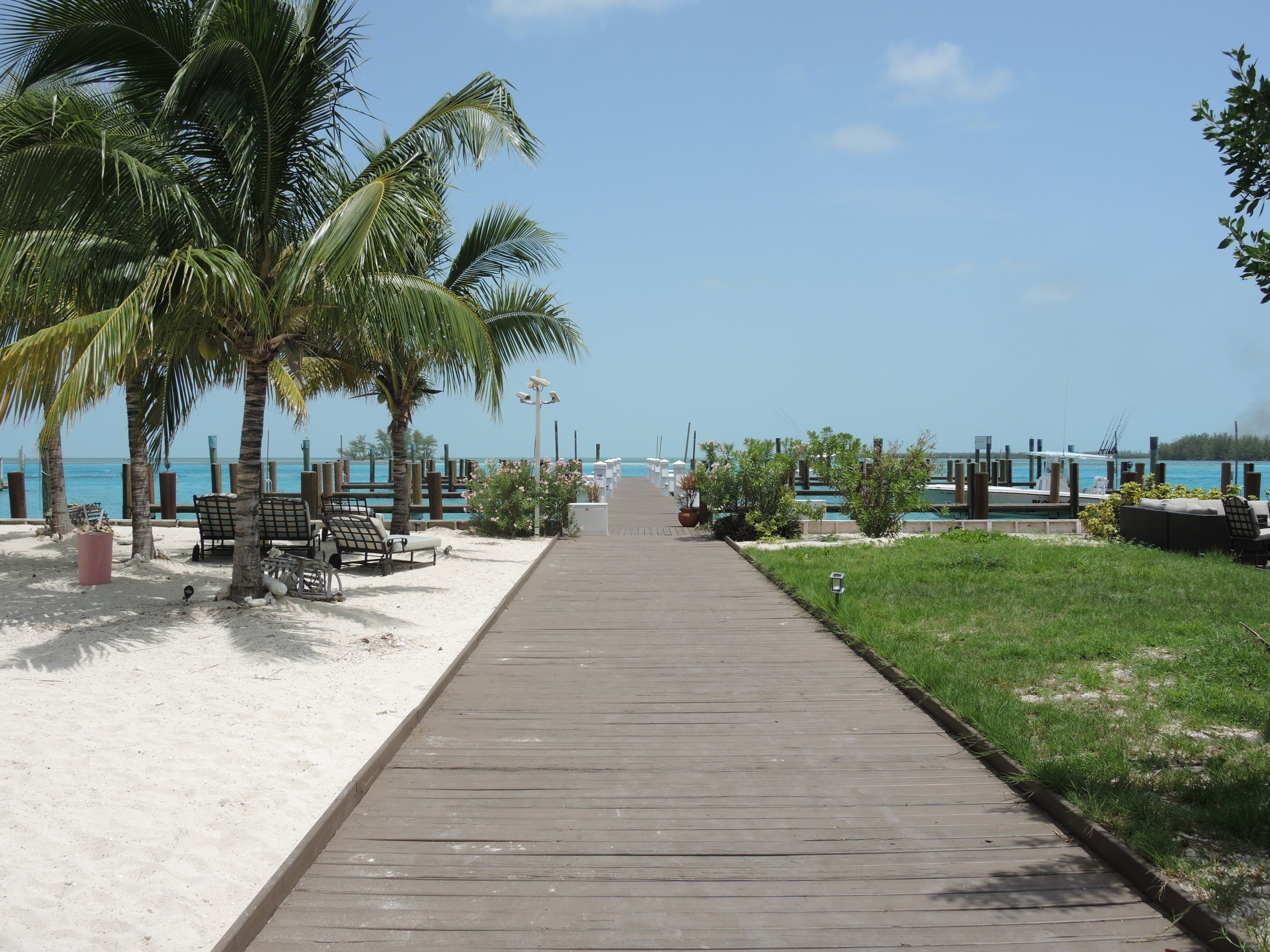
Marina

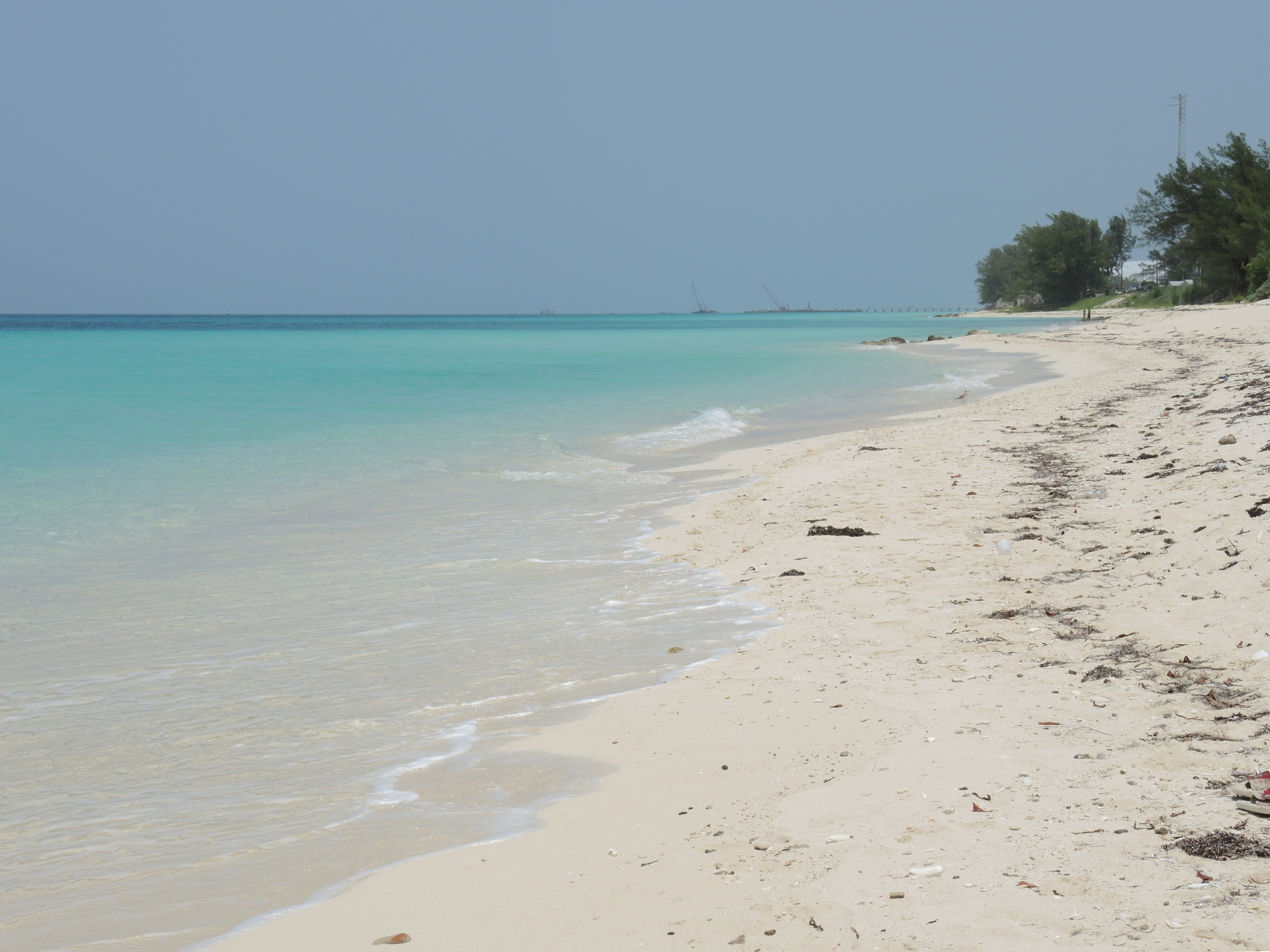
Beach

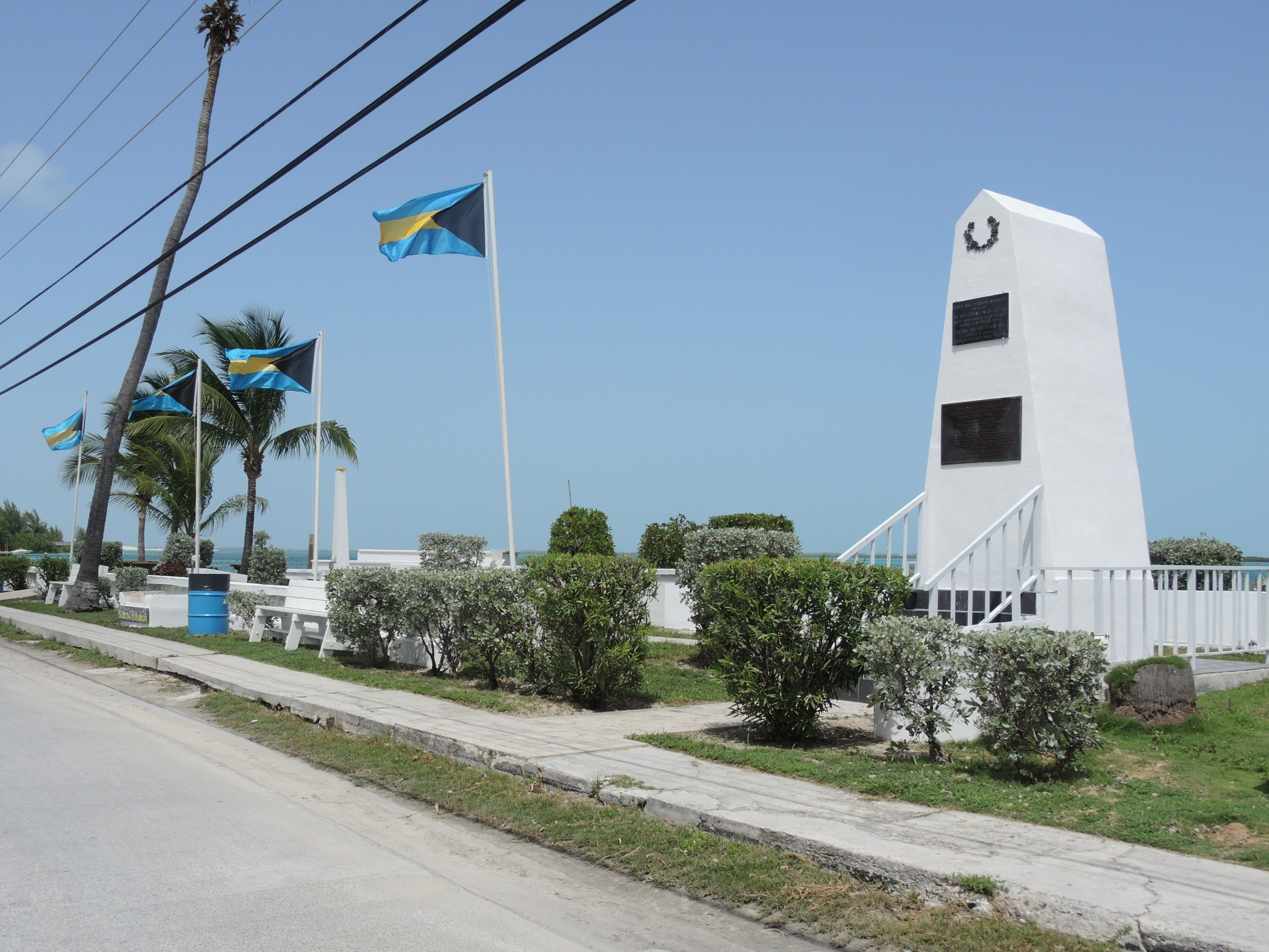
Veterans memorial

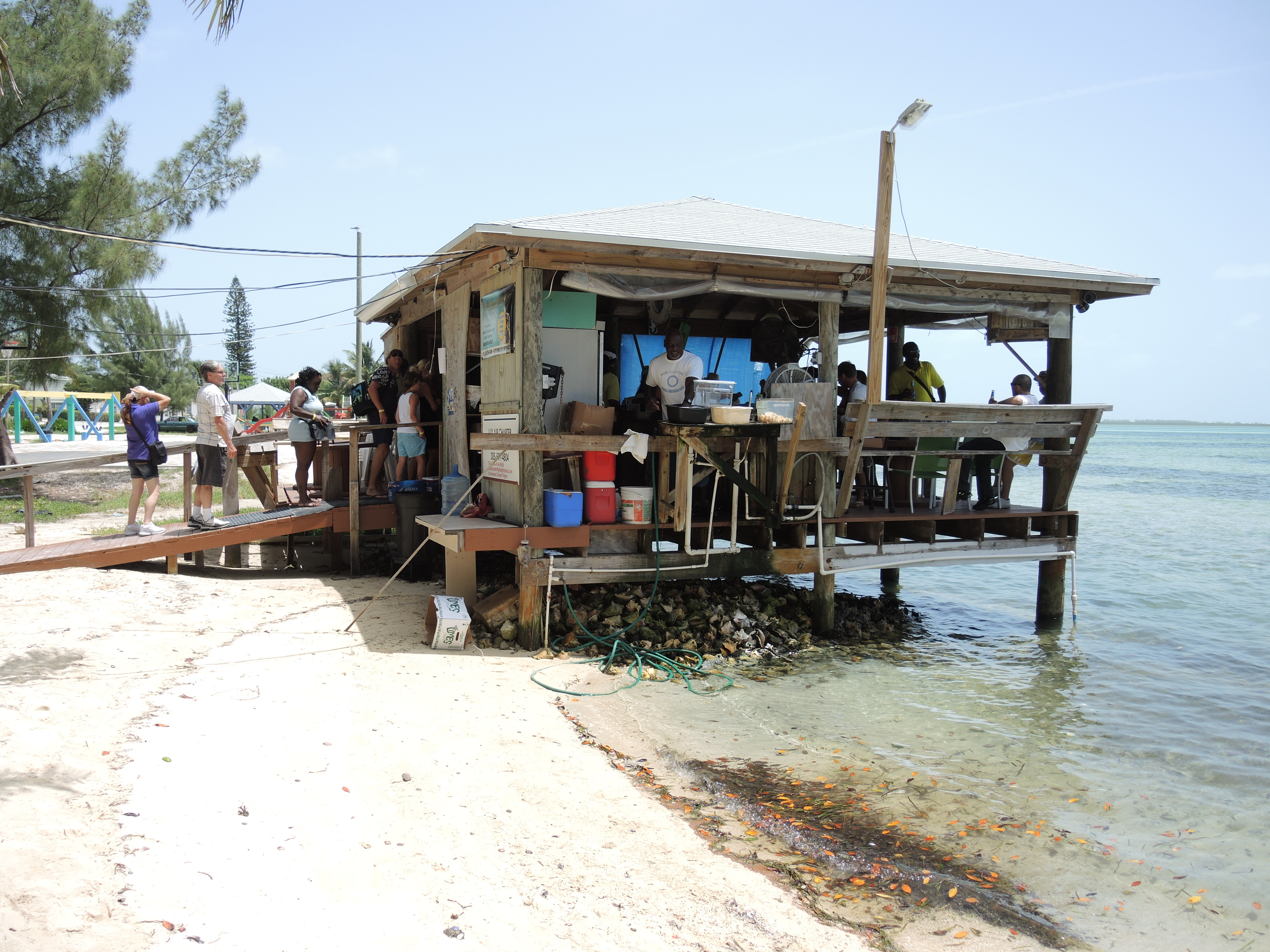
Restaurant

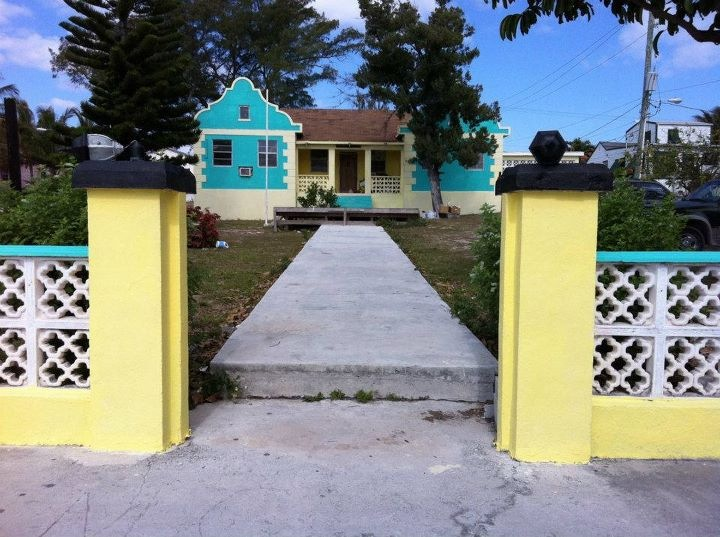
Governor house

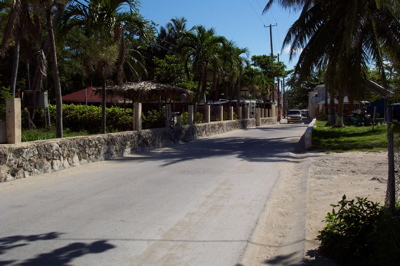
King's Highway

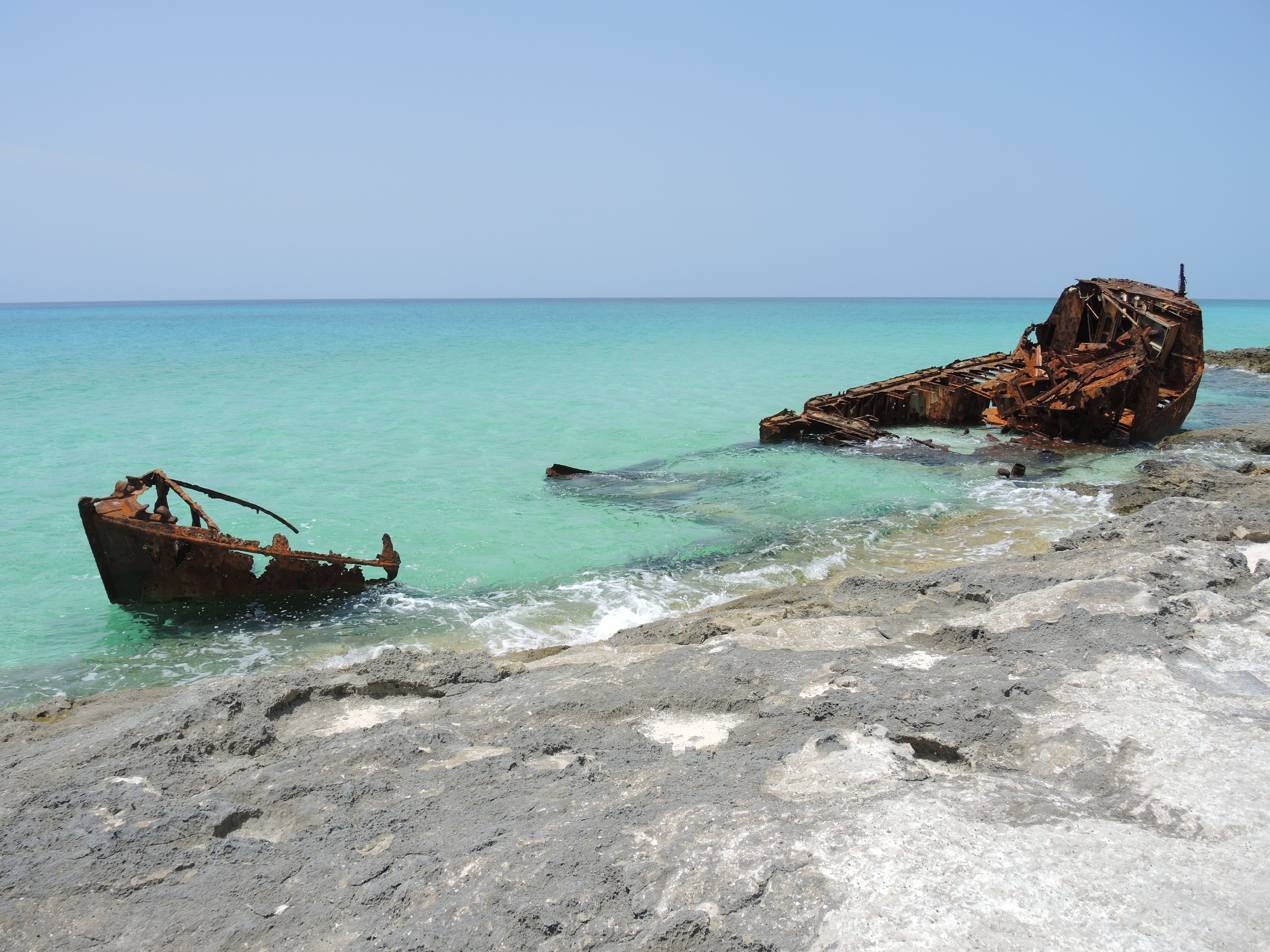
Shipwreck on Radio Beach
