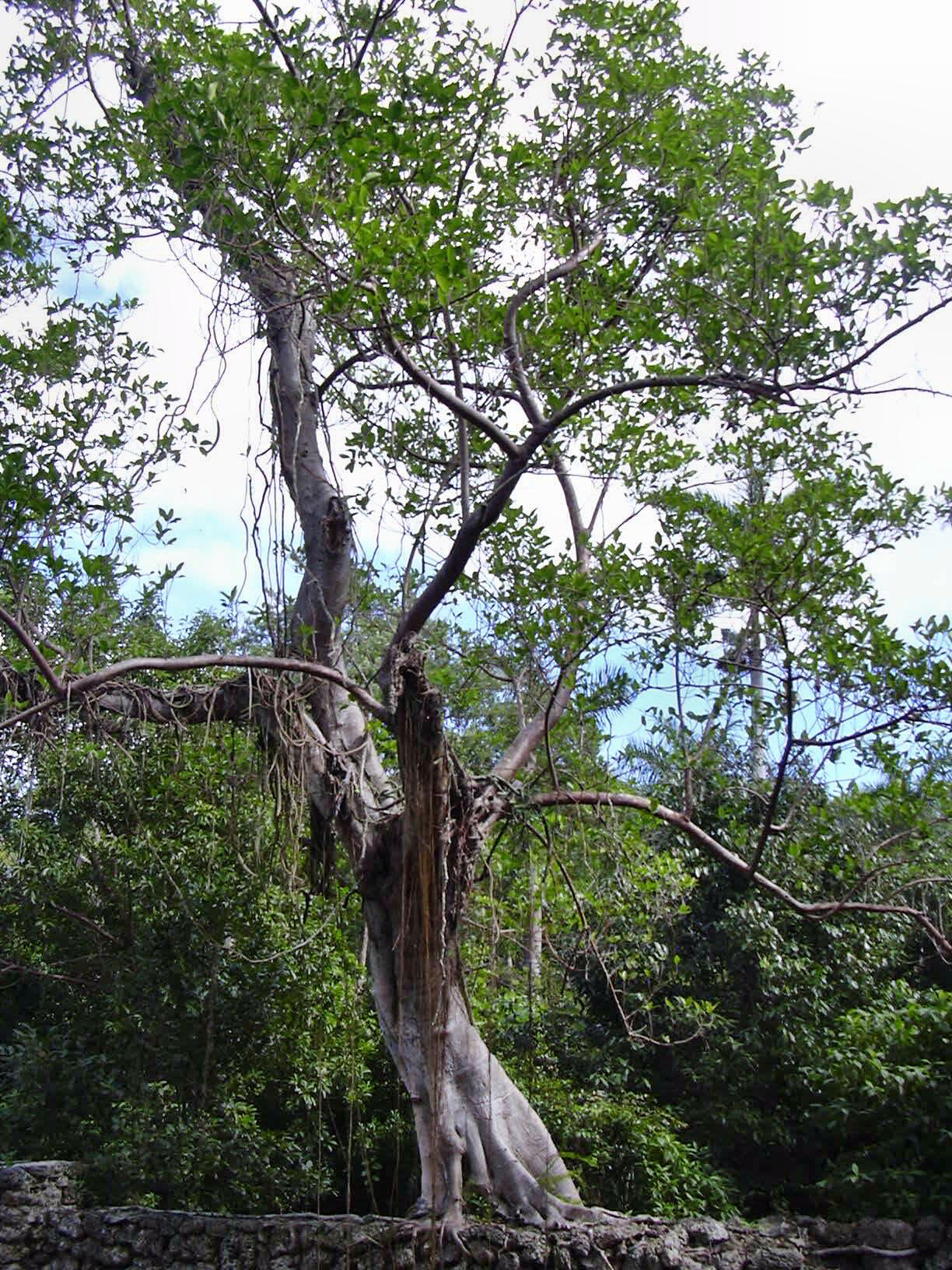
- Florida strangler fig in Deering Park, Florida

Conservation status
- Least Concern (IUCN 3.1)

- Secure (NatureServe)

Scientific classification
- Kingdom: Plantae
- Clade: Tracheophytes
- Clade: Angiosperms
- Clade: Eudicots
- Clade: Rosids
- Order: Rosales
- Family: Moraceae
- Genus: Ficus
- Subgenus: F. subg. Urostigma
- Species: F. aurea

Binomial name
- Ficus aurea Nutt. 1846, conserved name
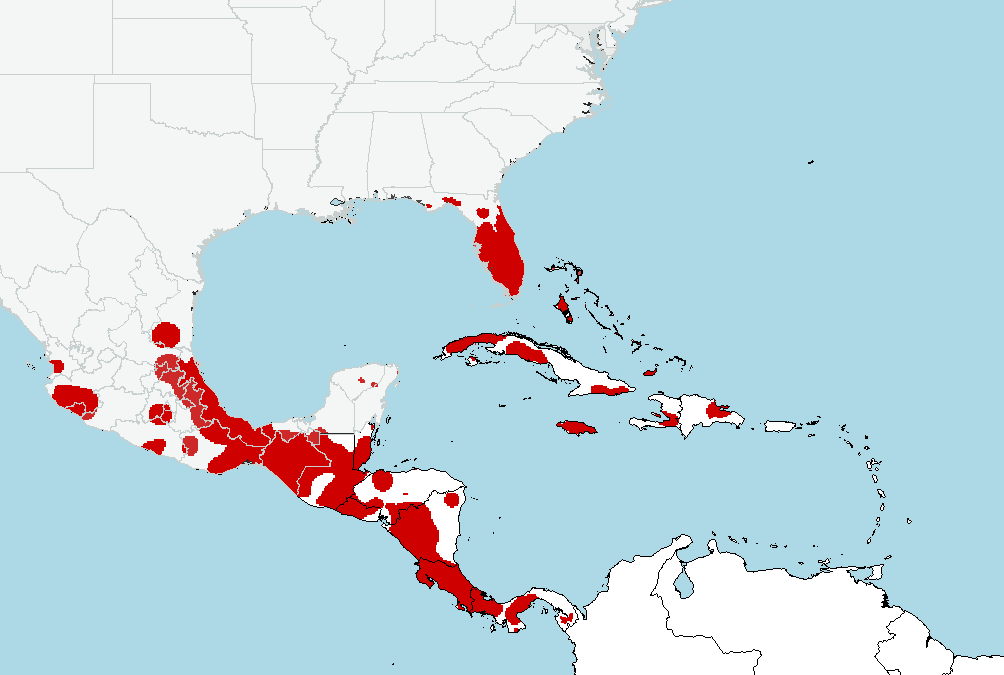
- Distribution map

Synonyms
- Synonymy: Ficus aurea var. latifolia Nutt.; Ficus cabusana Standl. & Steyerm.; Ficus ciliolosa Link 1822, rejected name; Ficus dimidiata Griseb.; Ficus jimenezii Standl.; Ficus laterisyce W.C. Burger; Ficus lundellii Standl.; Ficus mayana Lundell; Ficus rigidula Lundell; Ficus sapotifolia Kunth & C.D.Bouché; Ficus sororia Kunth & C.D.Bouché; Ficus venusta Kunth & C.D. Bouché; Ficus warczewiczii (Miq.) Miq.; Urostigma venustum (Kunth & C.D.Bouché) Miq.; Urostigma warczewiczii Miq.

= Ficus aurea =

Florida strangler fig

Species of strangler fig

Ficus aurea, commonly known as the Florida strangler fig (or simply strangler fig), golden fig, or higuerón, is a tree in the family Moraceae that is native to the U.S. state of Florida, the northern and western Caribbean, southern Mexico and Central America south to Panama. The specific epithet aurea was applied by English botanist Thomas Nuttall who described the species in 1846.

Ficus aurea is a strangler fig. In figs of this group, seed germination usually takes place in the canopy of a host tree with the seedling living as an epiphyte until its roots establish contact with the ground. After that, it enlarges and strangles its host, eventually becoming a free-standing tree in its own right. Individuals may reach 30 m (100 ft) in height. The tree provides habitat, food and shelter for a host of tropical lifeforms including epiphytes in cloud forests and birds, mammals, reptiles and invertebrates. F. aurea is used in traditional medicine, for live fencing, as an ornamental and as a bonsai.

== Description ==
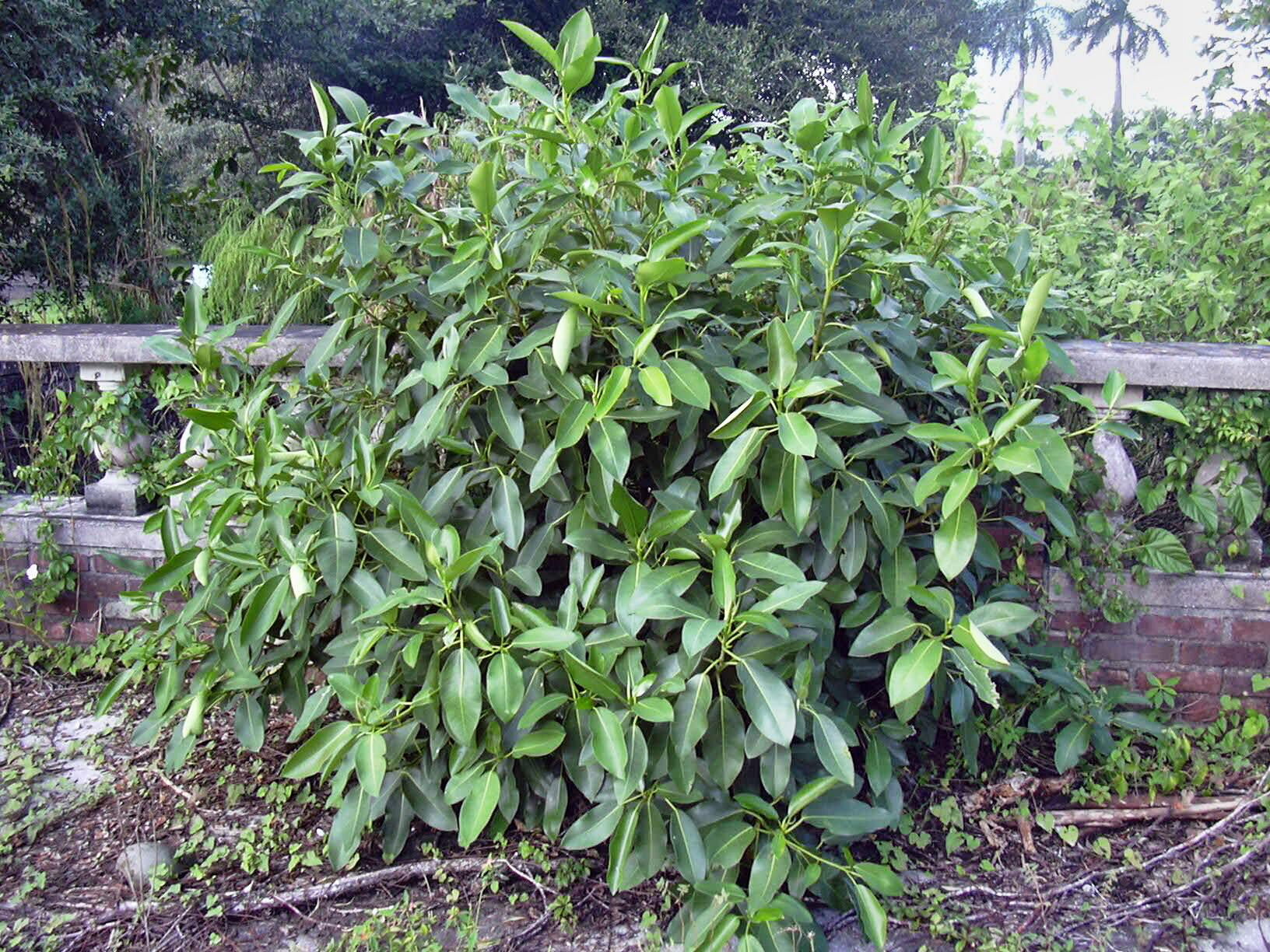
Ficus aurea sapling showing elliptic leaf shape at Long Key, Florida

Ficus aurea is a tree which may reach heights of 30 m (98 ft). It is monoecious: each tree bears functional male and female flowers. The size and shape of the leaves is variable. Some plants have leaves that are usually less than 10 cm (4 in) long while others have leaves that are larger. The shape of the leaves and of the leaf base also varies—some plants have leaves that are oblong or elliptic with a wedge-shaped to rounded base, while others have heart-shaped or ovate leaves with cordate to rounded bases. F. aurea has paired figs which are green when unripe, turning yellow as they ripen. They differ in size (0.6–0.8 cm [0.2–0.3 in], about 1 cm [0.4 in], or 1.0–1.2 cm [0.4–0.5 in] in diameter); figs are generally sessile, but in parts of northern Mesoamerica figs are borne on short stalks known as peduncles.

== Taxonomy ==
With about 750 species, Ficus (Moraceae) is one of the largest angiosperm genera (David Frodin of Chelsea Physic Garden ranked it as the 31st largest genus). Ficus aurea is classified in the subgenus Urostigma (the strangler figs) and the section Americana. Recent molecular phylogenies have shown that subgenus Urostigma is polyphyletic, but have strongly supported the validity of section Americana as a discrete group (although its exact relationship to section Galoglychia is unclear).

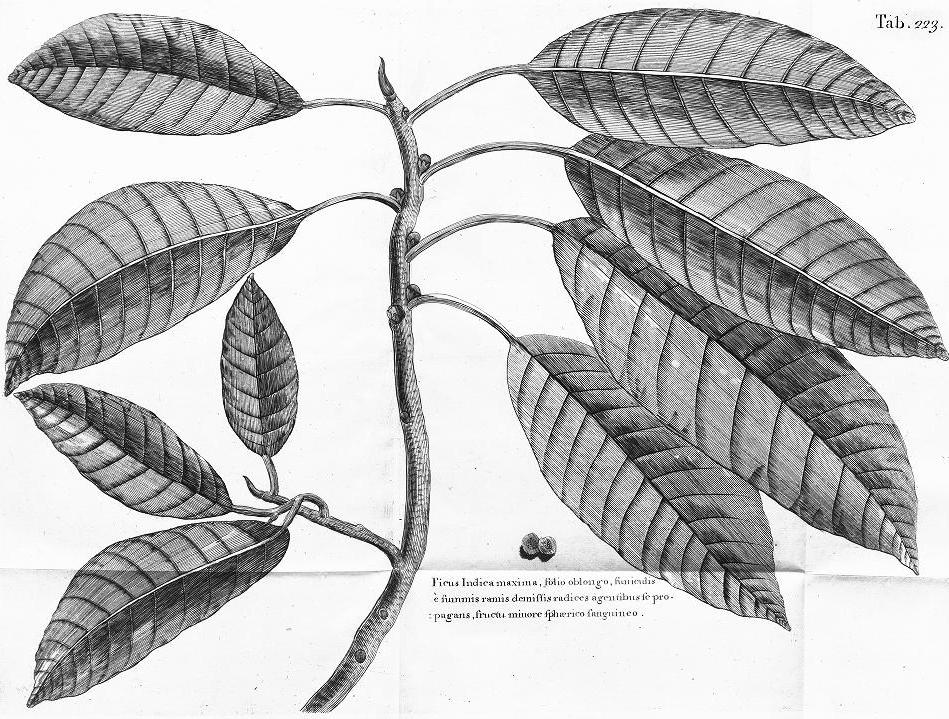
Engraving of Ficus maxima indica after a drawing by Hans Sloane, published 1725, the earliest published illustration of Ficus aurea and the basis of Thomas Miller's Ficus maxima. The unpaired figs in the illustration led to confusion as to the identity of the species described by Miller.

Thomas Nuttall described the species in the second volume of his 1846 work The North American Sylva with specific epithet aurea ('golden' in Latin). In 1768, Scottish botanist Philip Miller described Ficus maxima, citing Carl Linnaeus' Hortus Cliffortianus (1738) and Hans Sloane's Catalogus plantarum quæ in insula Jamaica (1696). Sloane's illustration of the species, published in 1725, depicted it with figs borne singly, a characteristic of the Ficus subgenus Pharmacosycea. As a member of the subgenus Urostigma, F. aurea has paired figs. However, a closer examination of Sloane's description led Cornelis Berg to conclude that the illustration depicted a member of the subgenus Urostigma (since it had other diagnostic of that subgenus), almost certainly F. aurea, and that the illustration of singly borne figs was probably artistic license. Berg located the plant collection upon which Sloane's illustration was based and concluded that Miller's F. maxima was, in fact, F. aurea. In his description of F. aurea, which was based on plant material collected in Florida, Thomas Nuttall considered the possibility that his plants belonged to the species that Sloane had described, but came to the conclusion that it was a new species. Under the rules of botanical nomenclature, the name F. maxima has priority over F. aurea since Miller's description was published in 1768, while Nuttall's description was published in 1846.

In their 1914 Flora of Jamaica, William Fawcett and Alfred Barton Rendle linked Sloane's illustration to the tree species that was then known as Ficus suffocans, a name that had been assigned to it in August Grisebach's Flora of the British West Indian Islands. Gordon DeWolf agreed with their conclusion and used the name F. maxima for that species in the 1960 Flora of Panama. Since this use has become widespread, Berg proposed that the name Ficus maxima be conserved in the way DeWolf had used it, a proposal that was accepted by the nomenclatural committee.

Reassigning the name Ficus maxima did not leave F. aurea as the oldest name for this species, as German naturalist Johann Heinrich Friedrich Link had described Ficus ciliolosa in 1822. Berg concluded that the species Link described was actually F. aurea, and since Link's description predated Nuttall's by 24 years, priority should have been given to the name F. ciliolosa. Since the former name was widely used and the name F. ciliolosa had not been, Berg proposed that the name F. aurea be conserved. In response to this, the nomenclatural committee ruled that rather than conserving F. aurea, that it would be better to reject F. ciliolosa. Conserving F. aurea would mean that precedence would be given to that name over all others. By simply rejecting F. ciliolosa, the committee left open the possibility that the name F. aurea could be supplanted by another older name, if one were to be discovered.

=== Synonyms ===
In 1920, American botanist Paul C. Standley described three new species based on collections from Panama and Costa Rica — Ficus tuerckheimii, F. isophlebia, and F. jimenezii. DeWolf concluded that they were all the same species, and Berg synonymised them with F. aurea. These names have been used widely for Mexican and Central American populations, and continue to be used by some authors. Berg suspected that Ficus rzedowskiana Carvajal and Cuevas-Figueroa may also belong to this species, but he had not examined the original material upon which this species was based.

Berg considered F. aurea to be a species with at least four morphs. "None of the morphs", he wrote, "can be related to certain habitats or altitudes." Thirty years earlier, William Burger had come to a very different conclusion with respect to Ficus tuerckheimii, F. isophlebia and F. jimenezii — he rejected DeWolf's synonymisation of these three species as based on incomplete evidence. Burger noted that the three taxa occupied different habitats which could be separated in terms of rainfall and elevation. Plants of the World Online accepts F. isophlebia and F. tuerckheimii as distinct species, and F. jimenezii as a synonym of F. aurea.

== Reproduction and growth ==
Figs have an obligate mutualism with fig wasps, (Agaonidae); figs are only pollinated by these wasps, and they can only reproduce in fig flowers. Generally, each fig species depends on a single species of wasp for pollination. The wasps are similarly dependent on their fig species in order to reproduce. Ficus aurea is pollinated by Pegoscapus mexicanus (Ashmead).

Figs have complicated inflorescences called syconia. Flowers are entirely contained within an enclosed structure. Their only connection with the outside is through a small pore called ostiole. Monoecious figs like F. aurea have both male and female flowers within the syconium. Female flowers mature first. Once mature, they produce a volatile chemical attractant. Female wasps squeeze their way through the ostiole into the interior of the syconium. Inside the syconium, they pollinate the flowers, lay their eggs in some of them, and die. The eggs hatch and the larvae parasitise the flowers in which they were laid. After four to seven weeks (in F. aurea), adult wasps emerge. Males emerge first, mate with the females, and cut exit holes through the walls of the fig. The male flowers mature around the same time as the female wasps emerge. The newly emerged female wasps actively pack their bodies with pollen from the male flowers before leaving through the exit holes the males have cut and fly off to find a syconium in which to lay their eggs. Over the next one to five days, figs ripen. The ripe figs are eaten by various mammals and birds which disperse the seeds.

=== Phenology ===
Figs flower and fruit asynchronously. Flowering and fruiting is staggered throughout the population. This fact is important for fig wasps—female wasps need to find a syconium in which to lay their eggs within a few days of emergence, something that would not be possible if all the trees in a population flowered and fruited at the same time. This also makes figs important food resources for frugivores (animals that feed nearly exclusively on fruit); figs are one of the few fruit available at times of the year when fruit are scarce.

Although figs flower asynchronously as a population, in most species flowering is synchronised within an individual. Newly emerged female wasps must move away from their natal tree in order to find figs in which to lay their eggs. This is to the advantage of the fig, since it prevents self-pollination. In Florida, individual F. aurea trees flower and fruit asynchronously. Within-tree asynchrony in flowering is likely to raise the probability of self-pollination, but it may be an adaptation that allows the species to maintain an adequate population of wasps at low population densities or in strongly seasonal climates.

Flowering phenology in Ficus aurea
| Phase | Description | Duration in F. aurea |
| A (pre-female) | Immature flowers | 2 days to >9 months |
| B (female) | Female flowers are receptive to pollination; female wasps lay eggs and pollinate flowers | 1 day to 3 weeks |
| C (interfloral) | Fig seeds and wasp larvae develop | 4 to 7 weeks |
| D (male) | Male flowers mature; wasps emerge, mate and female wasps disperse | 1 to 2 days |
| E (post-floral) | Fruits ripen | 1 to 5 days |

Flowering phenology in Ficus has been characterised into five phases. In most figs, phase A is followed almost immediately by phase B. However, in F. aurea immature inflorescences can remain dormant for more than nine months.

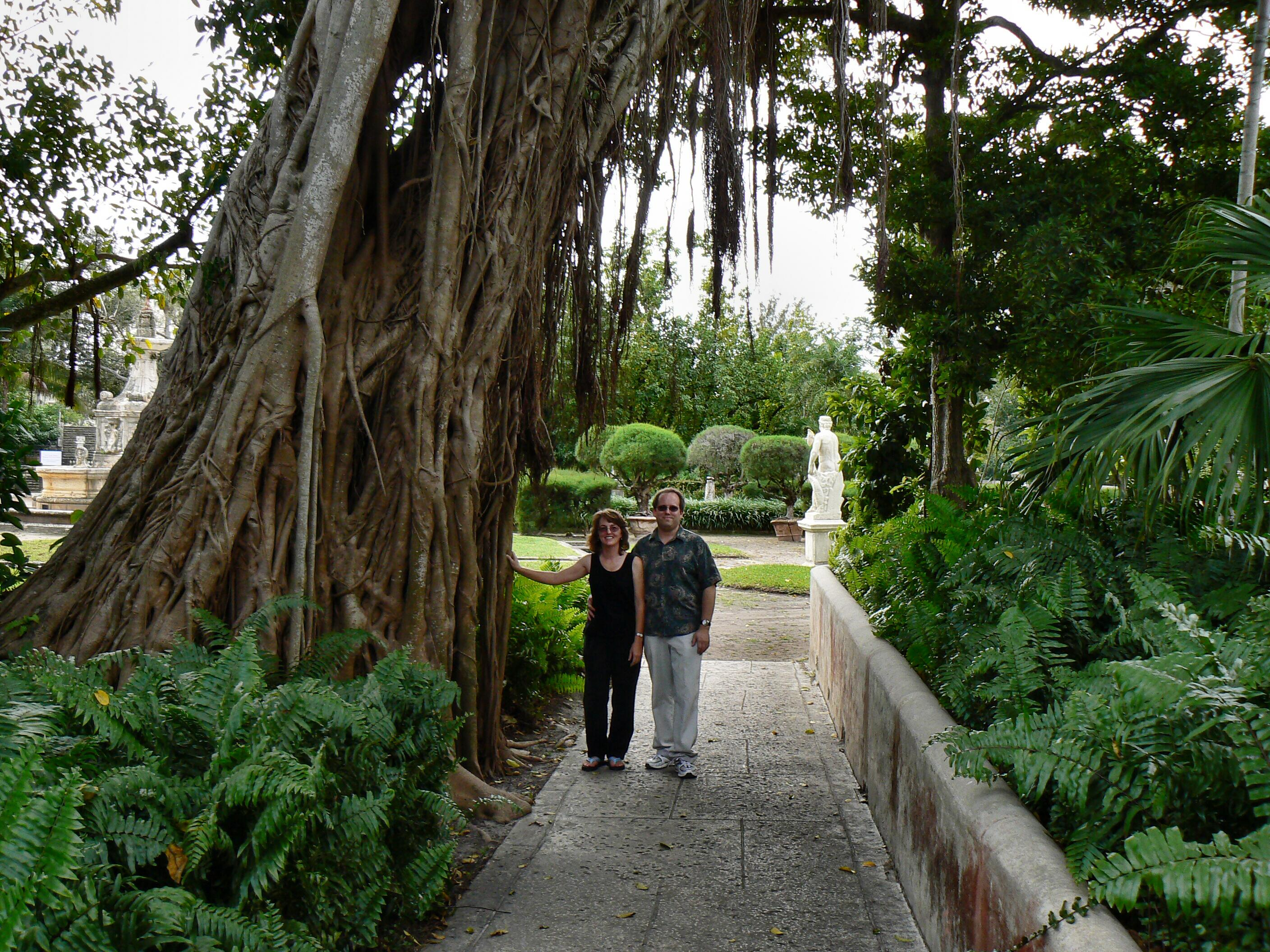
A Florida strangler fig with abundant adventitious roots at Villa Vizcaya, Miami

=== Growth ===
Ficus aurea is a fast-growing tree. As a hemiepiphyte it germinates in the canopy of a host tree and begins life as an epiphyte before growing roots down to the ground. F. aurea is also a strangler fig (not all hemiepiphytic figs are stranglers)—the roots fuse and encircle the host tree. This usually results in the death of the host, since it effectively girdles the tree. Palms, which lack secondary growth, are not affected by this, but they can still be harmed by competition for light, water and nutrients. Following Hurricane Andrew in 1992, F. aurea trees regenerated from root suckers and standing trees.

== Distribution ==
Ficus aurea ranges from Florida, across the northern Caribbean to Mexico, and south across Central America. It is present in central and southern Florida and the Florida Keys, The Bahamas, the Caicos Islands, Hispaniola, Cuba, Jamaica, the Cayman Islands, San Andrés (a Colombian possession in the western Caribbean), southern Mexico, Belize, Guatemala, Honduras, Nicaragua, El Salvador, Costa Rica and Panama. It grows from sea level up to 1,800 m (5,500 ft) above sea level, in habitats ranging from Bahamian dry forests, to cloud forest in Costa Rica.

Ficus aurea is found in central and southern Florida as far north as Volusia County; it is one of only two native fig species in Florida. The species is present in a range of south Florida ecosystems, including coastal hardwood hammocks, cabbage palm hammocks, tropical hardwood hammocks and shrublands, temperate hardwood hammocks and shrublands and along watercourses. In The Bahamas, F. aurea is found in tropical dry forests on North Andros, Great Exuma and Bimini. F. aurea occurs in 10 states in Mexico, primarily in the south, but extending as far north as Jalisco. It is found in tropical deciduous forest, tropical semi-evergreen forest, tropical evergreen forest, cloud forest and in aquatic or subaquatic habitats.

== Ecology ==
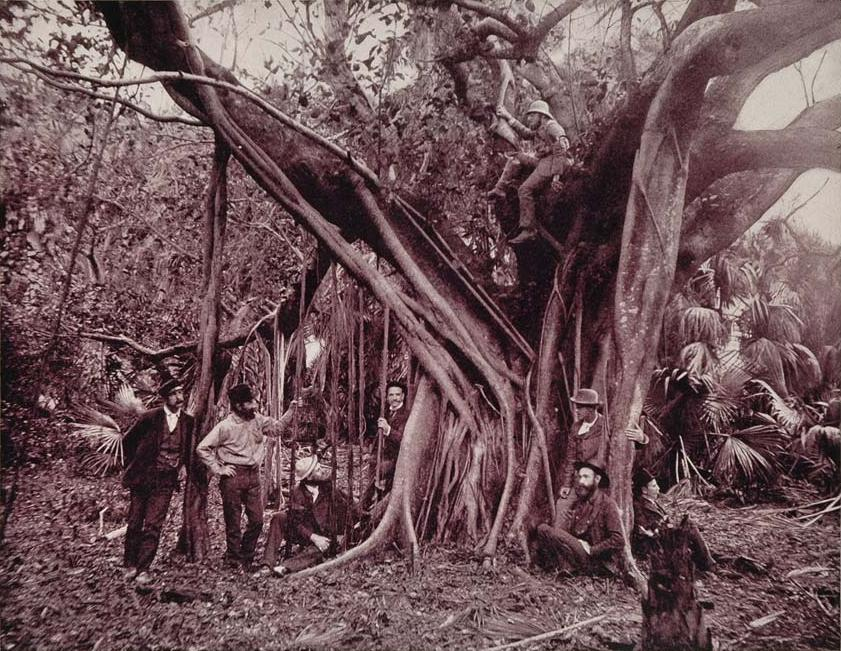
Rubber, or Banyan Tree, on Banana River, Florida—an 1893 photograph of what is now known as a Florida strangler fig

Ficus aurea is a strangler fig—it tends to establish on a host tree which it gradually encircles and "strangles", eventually taking the place of that tree in the forest canopy. While this makes F. aurea an agent in the mortality of other trees, there is little to indicate that its choice of hosts is species specific. However, in dry forests on Great Exuma in The Bahamas, F. aurea establishes exclusively on palms, in spite of the presence of several other large trees that should provide suitable hosts. Eric Swagel and colleagues attributed this to the fact that humus accumulates on the leaf bases of these palms and provides a relatively moist microclimate in a dry environment, facilitating seedling survival.

Figs are sometimes considered to be potential keystone species in communities of fruit-eating animals because of their asynchronous fruiting patterns. Nathaniel Wheelwright reports that emerald toucanets fed on unripe F. aurea fruit at times of fruit scarcity in Monteverde, Costa Rica. Wheelwright listed the species as a year-round food source for the resplendent quetzal at the same site. In the Florida Keys, F. aurea is one of five fruit species that dominate the diet fed by white-crowned pigeons to their nestlings. F. aurea is also important in the diet of mammalian frugivores—both fruit and young leaves are consumed by black howler monkeys in Belize.

The interaction between figs and fig wasps is especially well-known (see section on reproduction, above). In addition to its pollinators (Pegoscapus mexicanus), F. aurea is exploited by a group of non-pollinating chalcidoid wasps whose larvae develop in its figs. These include gallers, inquilines and kleptoparasites as well as parasitoids of both the pollinating and non-pollinating wasps.

The invertebrates within F. aurea syconia in southern Florida include a pollinating wasp, P. mexicanus, up to eight or more species of non-pollinating wasps, a plant-parasitic nematode transported by the pollinator, mites, and a predatory rove beetle whose adults and larvae eat fig wasps. Nematodes: Schistonchus aureus (Aphelenchoididae) is a plant-parasitic nematode associated with the pollinator Pegoscapus mexicanus and syconia of F. aurea. Mites: belonging to the family Tarsonemidae (Acarina) have been recognized in the syconia of F. aurea and F. citrifolia, but they have not been identified even to genus, and their behavior is undescribed. Rove beetles: Charoxus spinifer is a rove beetle (Coleoptera: Staphylinidae) whose adults enter late-stage syconia of F. aurea and F. citrifolia. Adults eat fig wasps; larvae develop within the syconia and prey on fig wasps, then pupate in the ground.

As a large tree, F. aurea can be an important host for epiphytes. In Costa Rican cloud forests, where F. aurea is "the most conspicuous component" of intact forest, trees in forest patches supported richer communities of epiphytic bryophytes, while isolated trees supported greater lichen cover.

Florida International University ecologist Suzanne Koptur reported the presence of extrafloral nectaries on F. aurea figs in the Florida Everglades. Extrafloral nectaries are structures which produce nectar but are not associated with flowers. They are usually interpreted as defensive structure and are often produced in response to attack by insect herbivores. They attract insects, primarily ants, which defend the nectaries, thus protecting the plant against herbivores.

== Uses ==
Ficus aurea, amongst other related Ficus species, has been a source of bark for preparing amate, the bark paper used for codices in the Mesoamerican civilizations. The oldest example dates back to 75 CE and was found in a shaft tomb culture site in Huitzilapa, Jalisco in Mexico.

The fruit of Ficus aurea is edible and was used for food by the Native Americans and early settlers in Florida; it is still eaten occasionally as a backyard source of native fruit. The latex was used to make a chewing gum, and aerial roots may have been used to make lashings, arrows, bowstrings and fishing lines. The fruit was used to make a rose-coloured dye. F. aurea was also used in traditional medicine in The Bahamas and Florida. Allison Adonizio and colleagues screened F. aurea for anti-quorum sensing activity (as a possible means of anti-bacterial action), but found no such activity.

Individual F. aurea trees are common on dairy farms in La Cruz, Cañitas and Santa Elena in Costa Rica, since they are often spared when forest is converted to pasture. In interviews, farmers identified the species as useful for fence posts, live fencing and firewood, and as a food species for wild birds and mammals.

Ficus aurea is used as an ornamental tree, an indoor tree and as a bonsai. Like other figs, it tends to invade built structures and foundations, and needs to be removed to prevent structural damage. Although young trees are described as "rather ornamental", older trees are considered to be difficult to maintain (because of the adventitious roots that develop off branches) and are not recommended for small areas. However, it was considered a useful tree for "enviroscaping" to conserve energy in south Florida, since it is "not as aggressive as many exotic fig species," although it must be given enough space.
