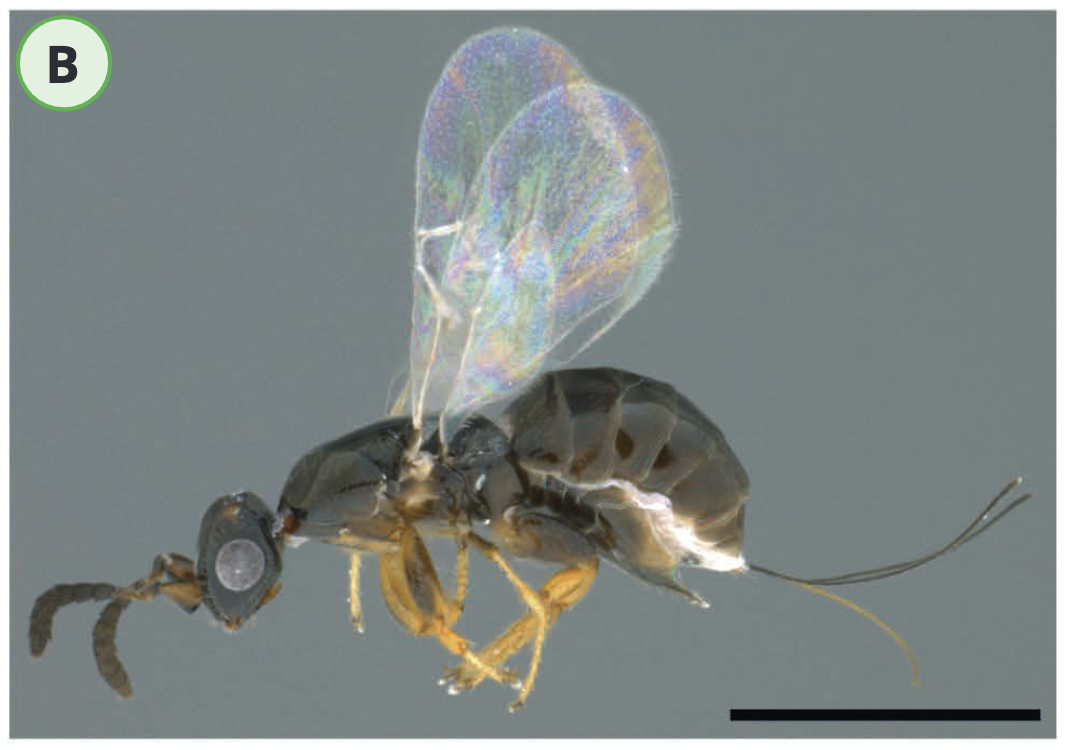
- Pegoscapus sp. from South Pantanal, Mato Grosso do Sul, Brazil. Scale bar is 1 mm long.

Scientific classification
- Domain: Eukaryota
- Kingdom: Animalia
- Phylum: Arthropoda
- Class: Insecta
- Order: Hymenoptera
- Family: Agaonidae
- Subfamily: Agaoninae
- Genus: Pegoscapus; Cameron, 1906

Type species
- Pegoscapus longiceps Cameron, 1906

Species
- Pegoscapus aemulus (Grandi); Pegoscapus aerumnosus (Grandi); Pegoscapus aguilari (Grandi); Pegoscapus amabilis (Grandi); Pegoscapus ambiguus (Grandi); Pegoscapus argentinensis (Blanchard, 1944); Pegoscapus assuetus (Grandi); Pegoscapus astomus (Grandi); Pegoscapus attentus (Grandi); Pegoscapus baschierii (Grandi); Pegoscapus bifossulatus (Mayr, 1885); Pegoscapus brasiliensis (Mayr); Pegoscapus bruneri (Grandi); Pegoscapus cabrerai (Blanchard); Pegoscapus carlosi (Ramírez, 1970); Pegoscapus clusiifolidis (Schiffler & Azevedo, 2002); Pegoscapus cumanensis (Ramírez); Pegoscapus danorum (Hoffmeyer, 1932); Pegoscapus elisae (Grandi); Pegoscapus estherae (Grandi); Pegoscapus flagellatus (Wiebes); Pegoscapus flaviscapa (Ashmead); Pegoscapus franki (Wiebes); Pegoscapus gemellus (Wiebes); Pegoscapus grandii (Hoffmeyer); Pegoscapus groegeri (Wiebes); Pegoscapus herrei (Wiebes); Pegoscapus hoffmeyeri (Grandi); Pegoscapus ileanae (Ramírez); Pegoscapus insularis (Ashmead); Pegoscapus jimenezi (Grandi); Pegoscapus kraussi (Grandi); Pegoscapus longiceps (Cameron); Pegoscapus lopesi (Mangabeira Filho); Pegoscapus mariae (Ramírez); Pegoscapus mexicanus (Ashmead); Pegoscapus obscurus (Kirby); Pegoscapus orozcoi (Ramírez); Pegoscapus philippi (Grandi); Pegoscapus piceipes (Ashmead); Pegoscapus silvestrii (Grandi); Pegoscapus tomentellae (Wiebes); Pegoscapus tonduzi (Grandi); Pegoscapus torresi (Grandi); Pegoscapus tristani (Grandi); Pegoscapus urbanae (Ramírez); Pegoscapus williamsi (Grandi)

= Pegoscapus =

Genus of wasps

Pegoscapus is a genus of fig wasp native to the Americas. They range from Florida and Mexico in the north to Argentina in the south. Fig wasps have an obligate mutualism with the fig species they pollinate. Pegoscapus pollinates species in section Americana of the subgenus Urostigma.

The genus is estimated to be 28 million years old using cytochrome oxidase nucleotide sequences, and more than 20 million years old based on a fossil in amber from the Dominican Republic.

== Habitat ==
Pegoscapus is a genus of fig wasp in the family Agaonidae. As a pollinating fig wasp, Pegoscapus share an obligate mutualistic relationship with fig trees of the genus Ficus via association with fig inflorescences (syconia), commonly called figs. Males are smaller in size with shorter antennae than females. Males have a black head and amber-colored, wingless body. Females, however, have wings. Pegoscapus are native to the Americas, ranging from Florida to Mexico.

== Mutualism ==
Fig wasps belonging to the genus Pegoscapus share an obligate mutualistic relationship with fig trees of the genus Ficus via association with fig inflorescences. The fig wasp and fig tree aid one another in their reproductive cycles. In their larval and reproductive stages, Pegoscapus wasps are confined to figs which provide protection and nutrients. Adult females exit the fig, collecting pollen, which they deliver to another fig inflorescence, therefore aiding in the fig reproductive cycle. This pollination mutualism has led to fig wasps developing honed morphological adaptions such as thoracic pockets to carry pollen with their forelegs to later deposit on the stigmatic surface of another fig during oviposition. Additionally, it has caused Pegoscapus to develop extreme host specificity and life cycles synchronized with the fig's reproductive cycle. For example, oviposition by fig wasps coincides with the receptivity of fig flowers, and the release of adult wasps aligns with pollen presentation. Fig phenology allows asynchronous fig development resulting in receptive figs year-round for Pegoscapus wasps.

Pegoscapus wasps lay eggs in fig trees' ovules. Each wasp larva feeds on a singular fig tree ovule. An ovule can therefore become a seed if pollinated or a "wasp gall" when the egg is deposited in it. The ovule cannot become both a seed and wasp gall. However, Pegoscapus do not oviposit in all fig ovaries even when the fig has enough female wasps with enough eggs to do so. The mutualism between figs and Pegoscapus persists in part due to the failure of all wasps to translate all of their eggs to offspring as. If they did translate all their eggs, the fig tree would not be able to produce seeds and reproduce. This occurs because some eggs and larvae are inviable or are victims of plant defenses. Moreover, lifetime reproductive success of female wasps entering the syconium is unaffected by a lack of oviposition in all fig ovaries, so this adaptation to maintain the mutualism is not harmful to Pegoscapus. Female wasps that enter a syconium are known as foundresses.

=== Reproduction and development ===
The life and pollination cycles of Pegoscapus species varies because of the variability in fig species' inflorescence morphology that comes with being a monoecious or dioecious fig. This fig tree variability correlates with variability in fig wasp morphology in terms of pollen collection and oviposition mechanisms in order to maintain the fig wasps' and fig trees' reproductive cycles. These differences between Pegoscapus species are good characteristics for phylogenetic inferences. However, the life and pollination cycles detailed here of monoecious Ficus aurea and Ficus citrifolia and their respective pollinators, Pegoscapus asseutus and Pegoscapus jimenezi, are representative of the general trends in Pegoscapus reproductive cycles.

Monoecious syconia of these species have a globular inflorescence with pistillate and staminate florets lining a sealed cavity. The entrance into the cavity is blocked by scales during early development of the syncoium. To assess the developmental stage of the syconia and therefore its readiness for her to enter, female Pegoscapus touch the entrance with her antennae to determine the looseness of the blocking mechanisms of the fig. If loose, she passes through the tight entrance, and her wings and some antennae detach. Some fig wasps cannot fully enter and die within the entrance.

Foundresses enter the central cavity of the syconium. The eggs are oviposited into the ovary of pistillate floret resulting in wasp galls. The larvae develop there while feeding on developing seed tissues or the seed itself. After each oviposition, pollen is spread nearby via various behavioral mechanisms. Usually two or more foundresses oviposition and pollinate one syconium simultaneously. After oviposition, the foundresses die in the central cavity while the larvae and seeds continue to develop.

After 27-32 days, the central cavity swells, and males exit the ovaries where they developed. Males make up the minority of the offspring generation, lack wings, and have reduced eyes. They search for mature females that remain in the floral ovaries where they developed. The males chew holes in the ovaries and insert their abdomens to mate with the females. Multiple males begin chewing an exit tunnel in the syconium wall, and then all males die. Females widen the exit hole and emerge into the central cavity. They begin searching for anthers still containing pollen, ensuring a large enough amount of pollen is collected before exiting the tunnel. The foundresses find another receptive syconia, pollinate it, and begin the cycle once more.

==== Male morphology ====
A common characteristic of male Pegoscapus is the seminal vesicle which produces fluids used to complete ejaculation. The seminal vesicle has two morphologically distinct anterior and posterior portions. The anterior portion stores mature spermatozoa and aides in reabsorption and digestion of defective cells and sperm fluid. The anterior portion is reported to occur in other fig wasp genera as well. Unlike other fig wasp genera, Pegoscapus has a second posterior seminal vesicle portion for ejaculation that is suggested to ensure only a small amount of stored spermatozoa are ejaculated per sexual copulation. This is important as it provides each short-lived male with the ability to mate with many females rapidly and in succession. Spermatozoa length and thickness differs between Pegoscapus species.

==== Female lethal combat ====
Female Pegoscapus show no aggression within or outside of the fig prior to any foundress ovipositing. However, the first foundress to oviposit in a non-specified Pegoscapus species has been found to become aggressive. This led to lethal combat and the death of the competitor by the first foundress. Injury, especially decapitation, was found to be effective at reducing competitors’ oviposition rates. In comparison to the non-specified Pegoscapus species, little aggression has been found in Pegoscapus tonduzi in similar contests. However, there were on average fewer foundresses per syconium in Pegoscapus tonduzi's native region of Panama. This suggests reduced aggression in this species is due to less competition for syconia as oviposition sites which are essential to successful reproduction.

=== Speciation ===
The global and local diversity of Ficus and Pegoscapus species has been difficult to explain based on the assumption of strict sense cospeciation and one-to-one pollinator specificity. Therefore, there is no generally accredited mechanisms on the speciation of figs and their pollinators. However, it has been suggested that hybridization and introgression due to pollinators switching and sharing hosts are the major mechanisms causing diversity of fig and wasp species.

Hybridization between Pegoscapus species results in new genotype combinations causing diversification and evolution of specialized pollinators. Inbreeding that occurs in Pegoscapus reinforces this divergence by causing these new genotype combinations to persist in the population. Coevolution of mutualism occurs because groups of genetically well defined wasp species tend to coevolve with genetically less well defined (frequently hybridizing) groups of figs. Since the fig trees have more variance in genotype, the wasp species must continually acquire adaptations to maintain the obligate mutualism in order to survive. Inbreeding reinforces these adaptations.

==== Cryptic species ====
Many fig trees may commonly be pollinated by several cryptic species. Microsatellite loci are vital when distinguishing cryptic Pegoscapus species for evolutionary and population genetic studies. Coexistence of cryptic fig wasp species within a single host fig species has been proven by genetic data via mitochondrial sequence differences implying old divergences. Some of the cryptic species’ pairs appear to be sister taxa, providing evidence for the long-term coexistence of shared hosts/colonization of novel fig species. These findings contest the strict one-to specificity between cospeciating figs and pollinators.

== Local mate competition, inbreeding, and sex ratios ==
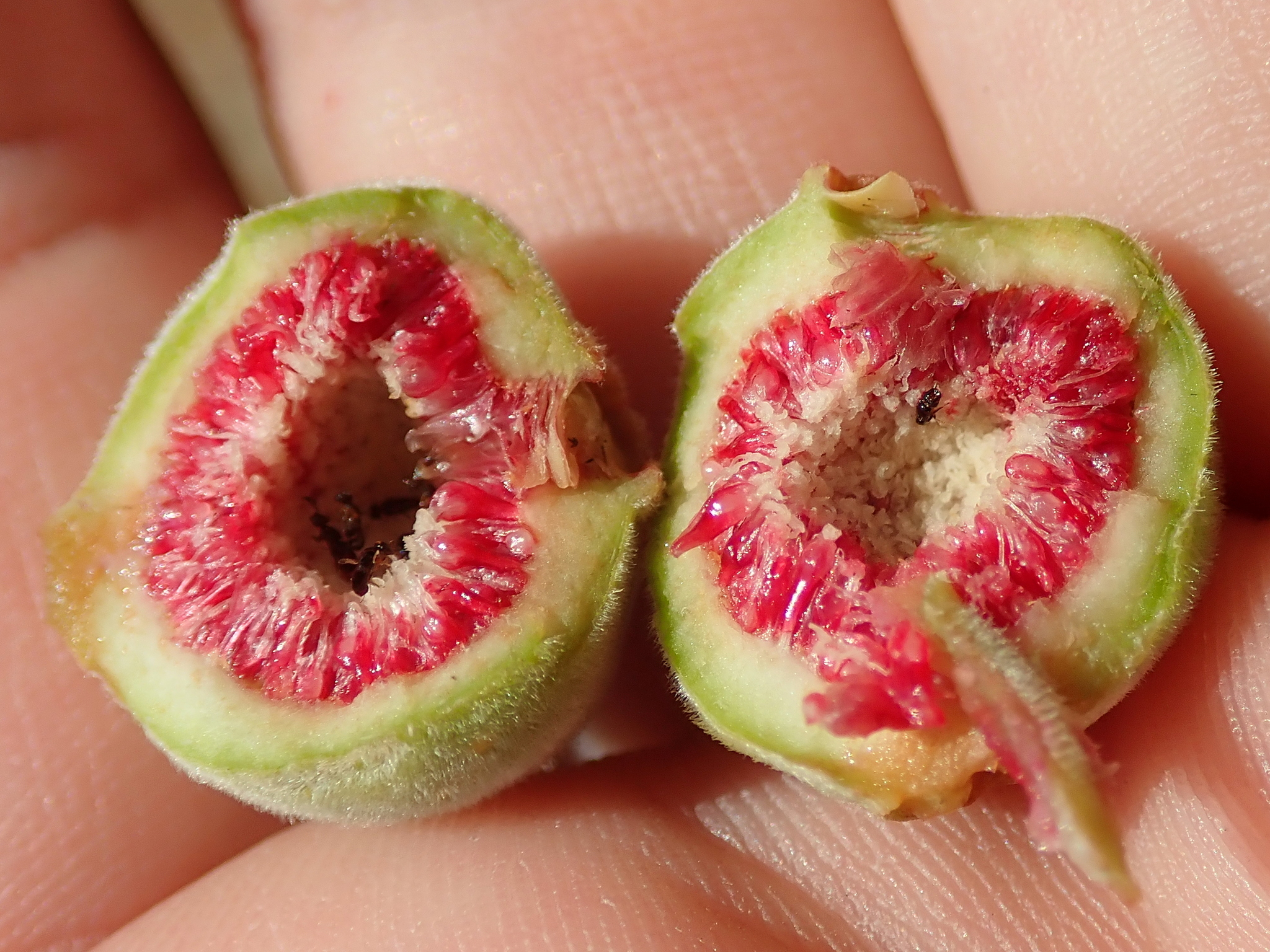
Fig wasps photographed in Tocatins, Brazil (2020)

Local mate competition (LMC) occurs when mating takes place among offspring of one or a few mothers in a discrete population. This causes brothers to compete with one another for mating partners. LMC increases inbreeding levels due to brothers competing for their own sisters as mates; this therefore increases mother-offspring relatedness. LMC favors female biased sex ratios because more females and fewer males reduces competition between males and increases mating opportunities for males. LMC occurrence is therefore supported by instances of isolated populations, high levels of inbreeding, and female biased sex ratios.

LMC has been found to occur in Pegoscapus because of the following attributes of the genus. Pegoscapus's entire reproductive cycle occurs within a fig; therefore, they have isolated populations creating competition between brothers for mates. Pegoscapus having female biases in brood (isolated sub populations) sex ratio have been found. Heterozygosity has been found to be extremely low in Pegoscapus. Inbreeding has been found to be higher than previously estimated by non-molecular methods.

Pegoscapus have a haploid diploid sex determination mechanism. This means males develop from the unfertilized eggs of their mothers; therefore, sons derive their entire genomes from their mothers. Mothers ensure their sons have high mating success and fitness by producing a female biased sex ratio in the eggs they lay. This causes the male to have ample females to mate with and low competition. This increases the mother's fitness as well because the male is then passing along the mother's genome.

Inbreeding caused by LMC is a mechanism that contributes to the formation of a female biased sex ratio because an inbred daughter carries twice the amount of the mother's genes in comparison to an outbred daughter, increasing their reproductive value. The daughter's brother has his entire genome derived from his mother, causing inbred daughters to obtain the maximum amount of the mother's genome. This maximizes the mother's fitness. This process occurs in Pegoscapus. The following assumptions to satisfy this theory are true in Pegoscapus: the male's only investment in offspring is sperm and a male can mate with multiple females.

=== Conflicts with local mate competition theory ===
The LMC model predicts female-biased sex ratios that increase fitness for Pegoscapus. Fitness is thought to be increased by reducing male competition and increasing the number of females available for males to mate. However, sex ratios have been shown to become less female-biased with increasing number of foundresses ovipositing in the same fig. This variation causes LMC to have minimal fitness benefits as there is more competition among brothers.

An assumption of LMC theory asserts each foundress wasp contributes the same number of eggs to the brood (isolated sub population). However, if sequential oviposition occurs, the second foundress is likely to contribute less eggs to the total brood. Therefore, first-arriving foundresses lay highly female-biased sex ratios. Later foundresses then lay smaller, less female-biased clutches. This is done to adjust their brood sex ratio according to the LMC level or by laying males first during oviposition.

During sequential oviposition, fig wasps lay most of their male eggs first followed by mostly female eggs. This is deemed a “slope” strategy, resulting in more accurate sex ratios that auto-adjust to foundress number, own and relative clutch (number of eggs oviposited) sizes, and sequential clutches. The slope strategy alters sex ratios once the capacity of a fig is crossed or when interference reduces clutch size. This slope strategy is a simpler mechanism for these fig wasps to maximize their fitness during sequential oviposition rather than using LMC which has minimal fitness benefits with this occurrence.

== Factors influencing reproduction ==
=== Non-pollinating fig wasps ===
Pegoscapus are a pollinating fig wasp as they collect and deliver pollen for figs. Non-pollinating fig wasps do not spread pollen. As the sex ratio of Pegoscapus tonduzi becomes more female biased, the number of non-pollinating fig wasps increased. This correlation is independent of the number of foundresses and brood size. This reveals that non-pollinating wasps have a direct effect in distorting the sex ratio of Pegoscapus tonduzi broods.

Secondary sex ratio (ratio at time of birth) may not precisely reveal the primary sex ratio (ratio at time of conception) when there is a large infestation of non-pollinating wasps. Figs entered by non-pollinating wasps are more likely to abort oviposited eggs. Retained unpollinated figs reflect higher larval mortality and lower number of fig wasps.

It has been theorized that competition between pollinating and non-pollinating fig wasp species for a viable oviposition site leads to partitioning of florets between species within syconia. However, this does not occur because the distribution of offspring within syconia have been observed to be identical for Pegoscapus silvestrii who oviposited with and without non-pollinating fig wasps that also oviposited. This suggests oviposition sites not to be limiting for neither non-pollinating fig wasps nor pollinating fig wasps.

=== Nematodes ===
Through a study on a tripartite system comprising a fig (Ficus petiolaris), female Pegoscapus, and host-specialist nematode parasite (Parasitodiplogaster sp.), it was found that nematodes are ubiquitous in host range in Baja California, Mexico. Nematode infection incidence seasonally fluctuates within and between locations. Infected pollinators sometimes have fitness declines through lower levels of offspring production. Moderate levels of infection (defined as 1-9 juvenile nematodes per host) were well tolerated by Pegoscapus whereas higher levels of infection (defined as 10 or more nematodes per host) were correlated with significant reduction in Pegoscapus lifespan and dispersal success. The overexploitation occurred in a low percentage of wasps/generation, so it was concluded that nematode infection is mostly benign.

=== Temperature ===
Longer developmental periods of Pegoscapus correlate with decreasing temperature because winter is the season with the lowest chances of the short-lived adults to find an oviposition site due to few receptive figs. However, fig wasps do not remain enclosed in their sheltered larval habitat during the winter because the decrease in temperature does not slow development enough. Therefore, fig-pollinator mutualisms are constrained to the tropics due to the difficulty of wasp persistence through the winter. However, the persistence of some fig-pollinator mutualisms at the northern parts of some subtropical regions still needs to be explained.

Fig wasp life span is significantly reduced with temperature increases predicted to occur by the end of the 21st century. If Pegoscapus cannot adapt to the increasing mean daytime temperature, then their shortened lifespan will reduce the dispersion of pollination among flowering fig trees, heavily impacting the tropical forest ecosystem. Fig trees act as a keystone resource by producing fruit year-round.

Figs and fig wasps in general are most abundant in the equatorial tropics. The flowering frequency of figs declines in colder and drier areas. This decreases the availability of receptive syconia for Pegoscapus to oviposit in, leading to local extinction of fig wasps and subsequent reproductive failure of figs. This limits the fig wasp mutualism to the tropics. However, the persistence of some fig-pollinator mutualisms at the northern parts of some subtropical regions still needs to be explained.
