= Bimini =

Bimini, Bahamas
- Third-Scheduled District
- Nickname: Fishing Capital of the Bahamas
- The Bahamas with Bimini highlighted on the west side
- Coordinates: 25°44′N 79°15′W
- Country: Bahamas
- Capital: Alice Town

Area
  - Total: 28 km^{2} (11 sq mi)

Population (2022)
  - Total: 2,361
  - Density: 84/km^{2} (220/sq mi)
- Demonym: Biminite
- Parliamentary representation: 1 House seat, shared with West End as a single parliamentary constituency
- Local government: 1 council; 0 townships

Bimini (/ˈbɪmɪniː/) is the westernmost district of the Bahamas and comprises a chain of islands located about 80 kilometres (50 mi) due east of Miami. Bimini is the closest point in the Bahamas to the mainland United States and approximately 210 km (130 mi) west-northwest of Nassau. The population is 2,361 as of the 2022 census.

== Geography ==
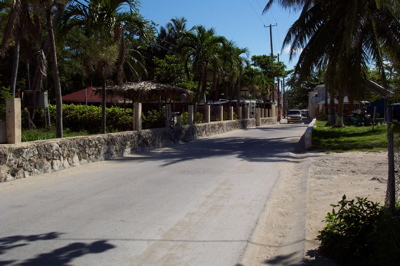
Alice Town

There are three main islands associated with Bimini, plus several additional cays and islets. Bimini's largest islands are North Bimini, South Bimini, and East Bimini. Smaller islands in the Bimini chain include Gun Cay, North Cat Cay, South Cat Cay, and Ocean Cay. The District of Bimini also includes the Cay Sal Bank, located more than 100 km (60 mi) to the south. Although administratively part of Bimini, it is geographically separate from the Bimini Islands.

North Bimini is about 11 km (7 mi) long and 200 m (700 ft) wide. Its main settlement is Alice Town, a collection of shops, restaurants, and bars on a road known as "The King's Highway". A second road, Queen’s Highway, runs nearly the length of the island, parallel to King’s Highway.

As a low-lying island, rising sea levels may cause the entire island to become submerged.

South Bimini (pop. 182) houses an airstrip, South Bimini Airport, and offers a quiet alternative to the slow bustle of North Bimini. There is a small community of homes on South Bimini known as Port Royale. For many years, South Bimini tourists were limited to boaters because there were few accommodations other than private homes.

Because Bimini is close to Miami, Florida, many American anglers go to the islands by boat to fish or to enjoy the local nightlife. Scuba diving and snorkeling are also popular activities, as there are many shipwrecks in the area, such as the wreck of the SS Sapona, which ran aground in 1926 during a hurricane. The top of the ship is exposed to the air while the bottom half is submerged. Parts of the wreck were stripped over the years and some of the wood was used in the construction of the Compleat Angler Hotel and bar on North Bimini.

== History ==
The first inhabitants on the island were the Lucayans, and the name Bimini means "two islands" or "the twins" in the Lucayan language.

Bimini is home to several landmarks said to contain mystical properties of obscure origins. Much of the historical data about these places is speculative in nature, and experts in various fields have opined across the full spectrum of explanation. The most contentious of these sites is Bimini Road.

During the period of Prohibition in the United States, Bimini was a favorite haven and supply point for the rum-running trade. Some claim that the term "the real McCoy" was applied to the rum provided by William McCoy, who used Bimini to transport whiskey to the U.S. during Prohibition, although the phrase pre-dates the Prohibition Era, first recorded in the U.S. in 1908 – and the phrase is the subject of numerous fanciful folk etymologies.

Chalk's International Airlines operated seaplane flights between Miami Harbor and the Bahamas from 1917, so the company was an island institution for generations. As goods on the island were expensive because of shipping costs, many locals used Chalk's flights to buy cheaper goods in Florida and take the goods to Bimini.

A seaplane operated by Miami Airways ditched into the sea off the coast of Bimini on March 22, 1922. All five passengers subsequently drowned. A Grumman Turbo Mallard of Flight 101 was en route to Bimini when it crashed on December 19, 2005, killing all 18 passengers and two crew; at least 11 of the passengers were Bimini residents.

On January 13, 2006, one of the more famous establishments in Bimini, the Compleat Angler Hotel, was destroyed by fire. The bar is remembered for the photographs and memorabilia of Ernest Hemingway that lined its walls and were lost in the fire, which also took the life of owner Julian Brown.

The final scene of the 1991 film The Silence of the Lambs was shot in Alice Town.

=== The Fountain of Youth ===
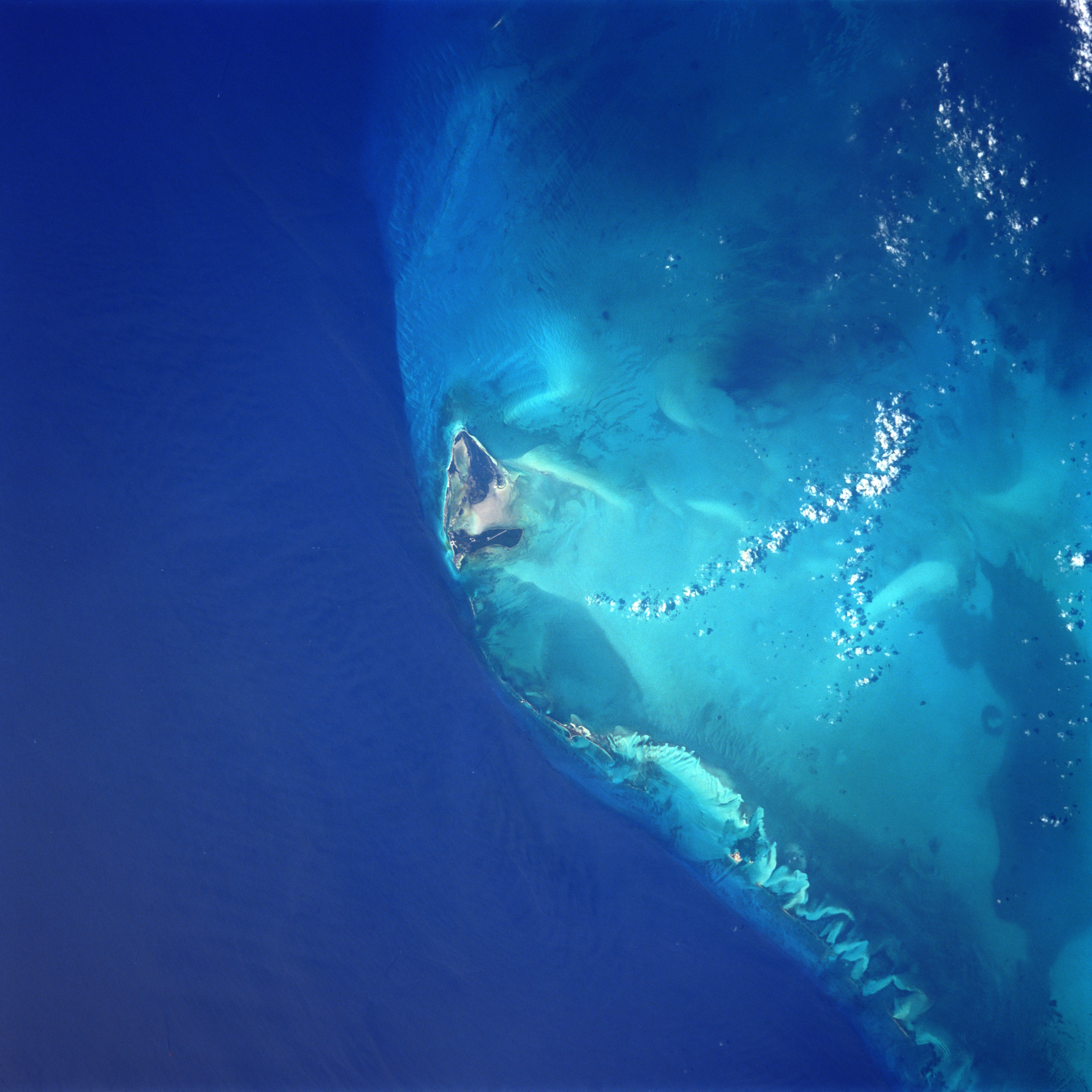
Bimini Island from space, June 1998

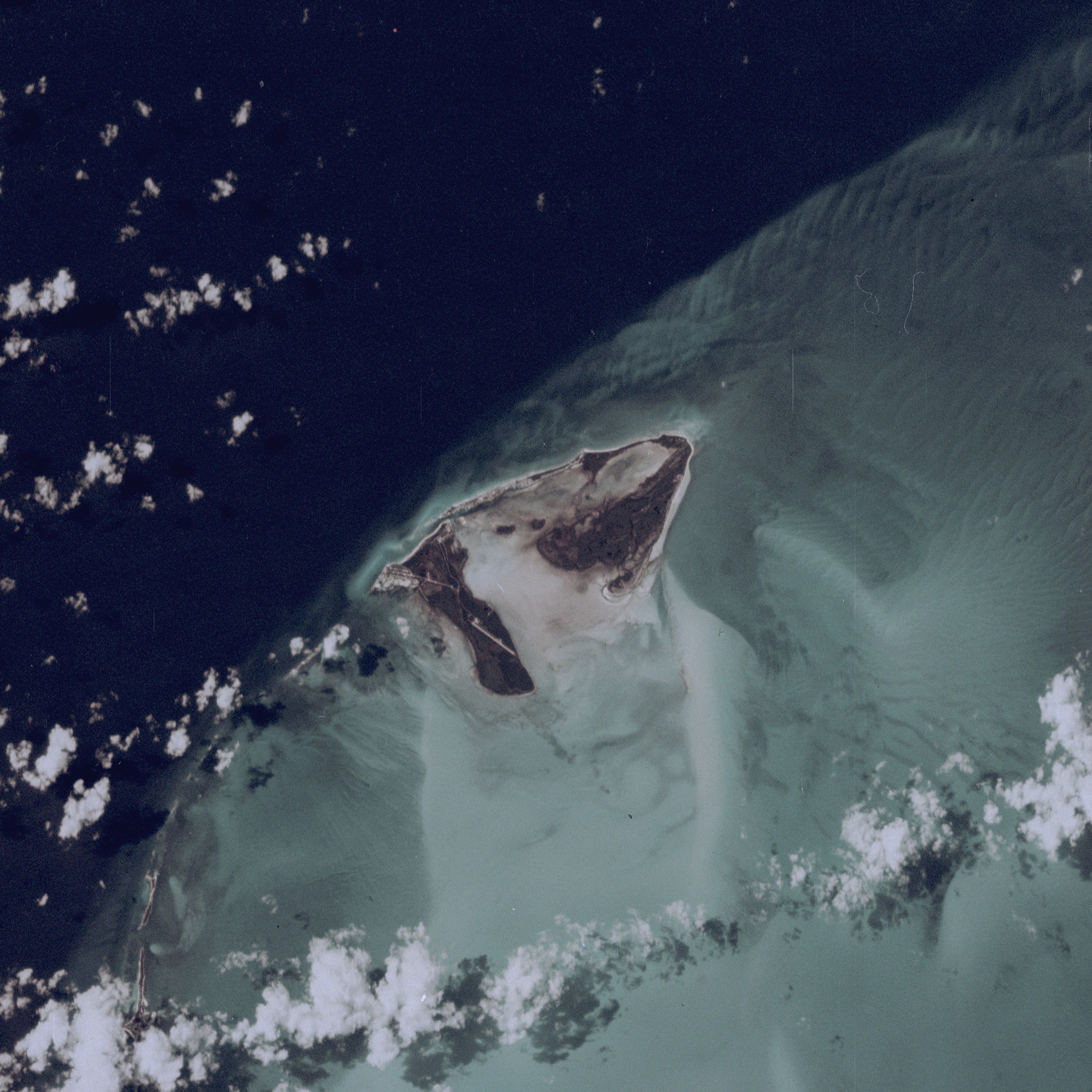
Bimini from space in 1984

Juan Ponce de León and his search for the Fountain of Youth included references to Bimini ("Beniny"). The Lucayans spoke of a land called Beimini where the fountain could be found. Although the location was erroneously associated with the Bahamas, the Natives referred to a location in the Gulf of Honduras. Although de León's expedition brought him to Florida, the fountain was rumored to exist within the shallow pools of South Bimini. Today there is a small freshwater well with a plaque commemorating the Fountain of Youth, on the road leading to the South Bimini Airport.

Found within the brackish mangrove swamp that covers 6 kilometres (3 1/2 mi) of the shoreline of North Bimini is The Healing Hole, a pool that lies at the end of a network of winding tunnels. During outgoing tides, these channels pump cool, mineral-laden fresh water into the pool. Because this well was carved out of the limestone rock by ground water thousands of years ago, it is especially high in calcium and magnesium.

== Transport ==
=== Air ===
The island is served by North Bimini Airport and South Bimini Airport, which receive domestic flights from various islands of The Bahamas as well as international flights from the United States.

=== Water ===
Ferries provide domestic inter-island transportation within The Bahamas, as well as an international passenger ferry connection to Port Everglades in Fort Lauderdale, operated by Baleària using the high-speed passenger catamaran, HSC Jaume II.

== Endemic species ==
Bimini is home to several unique, endemic and threatened species. The Bimini boa (Chilabothrus strigilatus fosteri), protected by Bahamian law, is the largest of the terrestrial reptiles on Bimini. The Bimini ameiva (Ameiva auberi richmondi) is a very common, fast-moving lizard on the island. The smalltooth sawfish (Pristis pectinata) is one of the rarest fish in the world, sometimes listed as a critically endangered species by conservation groups.

The Bimini Biological Field Station (BBFS) has captured and recorded 13 species of sharks in the shallow waters around Bimini. However, the number of sharks around the island is higher, considering the sharks of the deep waters off Bimini's western shores. Along with the species featured below, the BBFS has witnessed and recorded captures of shortfin mako (Isurus oxyrinchus), bigeye thresher (Alopias superciliosus), spiny dogfish (Squalus acanthias), and sixgill (Hexanchus sp.) sharks .

== Bimini Biological Field Station (Shark Lab) ==
The Shark Lab is a world-famous facility founded by shark biologist Dr. Samuel Gruber in 1990. The Shark Lab offers internships in marine biology to people interested in shark research and the conservation of the ocean's ecosystems. Located on South Bimini Island, it has done much research regarding the lemon shark.

== Politics ==
For elections to the Parliament of the Bahamas, it is part of the Bimini-Berry Islands constituency.

== Notable residents ==
Ernest Hemingway lived on Bimini from 1935 to 1937, staying at the Compleat Angler Hotel. He worked on To Have and Have Not and wrote a few articles, but mostly he fished aboard his boat Pilar, trolling the deep blue offshore waters for marlin, tuna and swordfish. Hemingway was attracted to Bimini by tales of the incredible fishing available in the Gulf Stream, the legendary “river” of warm water that rushes north past the Bahamas. An Atlantic blue marlin with a mass of 500 pounds (230 kg) caught off Bimini allegedly inspired Hemingway to write The Old Man and the Sea and Islands in The Stream.

While not a resident of the islands, Martin Luther King Jr. visited in 1964 and worked on his Nobel Peace Prize acceptance speech while there.

South Bimini was home to Joseph C. Mackey, the founder of Mackey Airlines, which was later bought by Eastern Airlines. He built a home on the southern tip of South Bimini. This structure would become the Sunshine Inn and is currently a bar and restaurant, though the hotel was damaged by a hurricane and was subsequently demolished.

Adam Clayton Powell Jr., who was excluded from the U.S. House of Representatives because of allegations that he misappropriated committee funds for personal use, stayed in Bimini from January 1967 to April 1969 in self-imposed exile until the Supreme Court of the United States ruled that the House had acted unconstitutionally when it excluded Powell, a duly elected member. In 1972, Powell died of cancer in Miami. Following his funeral in New York, his ashes were taken to Bimini and scattered in the waters surrounding the islands.

There is rumor of the famed Chicano civil rights lawyer, Oscar Zeta Acosta, of Fear and Loathing in Las Vegas fame potentially meeting his end after returning from the island of Bimini to Key Biscayne in 1974 during a failed attempt to smuggle drugs. According to the story told to Hunter S. Thompson, upon their boat nearly reaching the shoreline of the southern tip Key Biscayne, Acosta and his companions were ambushed when they suddenly found themselves surrounded by bright lights from boats that "appeared out of nowhere". Gunfire erupted and one of Acosta's companions was immediately killed by being shot in the head. Acosta, acting quickly, floored the boat's throttle and plowed into and over one of the ambusher's boats and, upon making it to shore, he grabbed a small suitcase likely containing drugs and ran off inland into the island. The veracity of this story was deemed questionable by Thompson, as he had heard it secondhand from the individual whose boat Acosta had borrowed for the smuggling attempt. This came to represent one of a number of possible Acosta sightings that Thompson had been told of, which he would term "buffalo sightings", from all around the world following Acosta's official disappearance in 1974 under suspicious circumstances.

In May 1987, Colorado Senator Gary Hart's presidential bid was derailed after media reports exposed a relationship with model Donna Rice. A well known photo of Rice sitting on Hart's lap on one of Bimini's docks was published by the National Enquirer after Hart suspended his presidential campaign.

Jody Weech, Miss Commonwealth Bahamas 1992, was from Bimini. She made the Top 10 in the Miss World contest in Sun City, South Africa. She received the title Miss World Caribbean.

V. J. Edgecombe, current National Basketball Association (NBA) player for the Philadelphia 76ers, was born and spent his childhood in Bimini. Edgecombe described himself as "[coming] from nothing", living off a generator due to limited electricity. He migrated to the United States when he was in ninth grade, originally settling in Florida.

== Bimini Bay Resort controversy ==
In May 2008, marine conservationist Jean-Michel Cousteau publicly criticized the Bimini Bay Resort, now known as Hilton at Resorts World Bimini, labeling it a "catastrophe." He warned that proceeding with the resort's phase II expansion would "certainly strip this island paradise of its precious natural riches," predicting a long-term decline in economic, social, and environmental prosperity for both residents and visitors. The resort, operated by the Genting Group, has faced ongoing scrutiny from environmentalists due to its large-scale development on North Bimini, including a 750-acre complex with a casino, marina, and extensive residential properties.

== See also ==
- Bimini Island Air
- Bimini Road
