= Lashell Adderley =

Bahamian lawyer and politician

President of the Senate of the Bahamas
- Incumbent
- Assumed office 7 October 2021
- Prime Minister: Philip Davis
- Preceded by: Mildred Hall-Watson

Personal details
- Born: 1968 (age 57–58)
- Party: Progressive Liberal Party

Julie Lashell Adderley (born 1968) is a Bahamian lawyer and politician who has served as President of the Senate of the Bahamas since 7 October 2021. Adderley's leadership of the Senate and Patricia Deveaux's leadership of the House of Assembly made it the first time that women led both chambers of the Parliament of the Bahamas.

== Career ==
Adderley is a lawyer who has worked as legal counsel for Bahamas First General Insurance, and as a legal and compliance manager and corporate secretary for Bahamas First Holdings. In 2024 she received an honorary Doctor of Laws degree from Northern Caribbean University in Jamaica, awarded in recognition of her career as a legislator, attorney-at-law and economist.

From 2017, she was a member of the Progressive Liberal Party's constitution committee to review its policies.

Adderley was appointed President of the Senate the day she was sworn in, 6 October 2021, the fifth woman to hold the role. She was appointed at the same time as Patricia Deveaux was made Speaker of the House of Assembly, the first time women have led both houses at the same time. Prime Minister Philip "Brave" Davis had been criticised the week prior for a lack of gender equality, with Adderley one of only two female Senate appointments.

== Private life ==
She is a practising Seventh-day Adventist who was raised in the church and is a member of the Johnson Park Seventh-day Adventist Church in New Providence, where she has also served on the school board of Bahamas Academy and on the Constitution and By-Laws Committee of the South Bahamas Conference.

== Political positions ==
Adderley supports criminalizing marital rape. She supports capital punishment and called for hanging to be brought back after the murder of a 12-year old in 2024.
