= Franklyn Wilson =

Bahamian politician

Sir Franklyn Wilson

Member of Parliament for Fort Charlotte
- In office 1982–1986
- Preceded by: Valentine Grimes
- Succeeded by: Zhivargo Laing

Member of Parliament for Grants Town
- In office 1972–1977

Personal details
- Born: 27 March 1947 (age 79)
- Party: Progressive Liberal Party
- Spouse: Sharon R. Wilson
- Education: Dalhousie University

Sir Franklyn Roosevelt Wilson (born 27 March 1947) is a Bahamian businessman and politician from the Progressive Liberal Party (PLP). He served as a member of the House of Assembly.

== Biography ==
Wilson graduated from Dalhousie University in Halifax, Nova Scotia. He studied business and commerce. In the 1972 Bahamian general election, Franklyn Wilson became one of the youngest people to have been elected to the House of Assembly, in the constituency of Grants Town.

Sir Franklyn Wilson served as Chairman of the Council of the College of The Bahamas (COB) from 2002 to 2007. Wilson was chairman of Eleuthera Properties Ltd. In 2012, Wilson was the negotiator for the proposed government nationalisation of BTC. Wilson is the chairman of Sunshine Holdings Limited (SHL), one of the oldest and largest conglomerates in The Bahamas. He is chair of Arawak Homes. In 2017, he criticised the Christie administration for the Homeowner Protect Act.

At the 2021 Bahamian general election, Wilson said the Progressive Liberal Party’s plan to increase the private sector minimum wage would benefit the majority of workers though would adversely affect some. In 2023, he advocated for land reform. In 2024, Wilson denied that his company would take over assets of Bahamas Power and Light (BPL).

Franklyn Wilson was awarded the Order of St. Michael and St. George at the 2016 New Year Honours.

His wife Sharon Wilson was President of the Senate of the Bahamas.

== See also ==
- List of members of the Parliament of the Bahamas
