= Vernon Symonette =

Bahamian politician (1937–2022)

Vernon Symonette CMG

Speaker of the House of Assembly of the Bahamas
- In office 2 September 1992 – 9 April 1997
- Prime Minister: Hubert Ingraham
- Preceded by: Milo Butler Jr.
- Succeeded by: Rome Italia Johnson

Personal details
- Born: 8 November 1937
- Died: 7 July 2022 (aged 84)
- Party: Free National Movement

Vernon Symonette (8 November 1937 - 7 July 2022) was a Bahamian politician and former Speaker of the House of Assembly.

He was born on 8 November 1937 in Matthew Town, Inagua. He worked as an accountant. He was a freemason and treasurer in Zion Baptist Church, Inagua.

He was a member of Free National Movement. He was first elected to the House of Assembly of the Bahamas in 1982. He represented the Mayaguana, Inagua, Crooked Island, Acklins and Long Cay constituency. He was elected Speaker of the House from 1992 to 1997. He was a member of the House of Assembly until 2002. He was minister of state in the ministry of works. He was also non-resident ambassador to several Central American countries.

He died on 7 July 2022.
