= 1935 New Year Honours =

British royal recognitions

The 1935 New Year Honours were appointments by King George V to various orders and honours to reward and highlight good works by citizens of the United Kingdom and British Empire. They were announced on the 28 of December, 1934.

The recipients of honours are displayed here as they were styled before their new honour, and arranged by honour, with classes (Knight, Knight Grand Cross, etc.) and then divisions (Military, Civil, etc.) as appropriate.

== United Kingdom and British Empire ==
=== Baron ===
- The Right Honourable Sir Henry Bucknall Betterton Bt CBE Minister of Labour, 1931-1934. Chairman of the Unemployment Assistance Board.
- Sir Thomas Fermor-Hesketh Bt JP For political and public services in Northamptonshire.
- Lieutenant-Colonel Sir Wyndham Raymond Portal Bt DSO MVO JP DL For public services.

=== Privy Councillor ===
The King appointed the following to His Majesty's Most Honourable Privy Council:

- Colonel Victor Alexander John, Marquess of Linlithgow KT GCIE OBE TD DL

=== Baronetcies ===
- Colonel Edward Archibald Ruggles-Brise MC TD JP DL MP Member of Parliament for the Maldon Division of Essex, 1922–23, and since 1924. For political and public services in connection with agriculture.
- Richard Durning Holt JP For public services.
- Sir Harold Vincent Mackintosh JP For political and public services.
- Colonel Frank Robert Simpson TD JP DL President of Blaydon Conservative Association. For political and public services in Durham and Northumberland.
- Sir Holburt Jacob Waring CBE MS FRCS President of the Royal College of Surgeons.

=== Knight Bachelor ===
- Alderman Albert Reuben Atkey JP Chairman of the Nottingham Water Committee and of the Joint Advisory Committee on River Pollution.
- Charles Vernon Boys FRS For services to physics., A past President of the Physical Society of London.
- Charles Herbert Bressey CB CBE Chief Engineer, Roads Department, Ministry of Transport.
- Professor Walter Langdon-Brown FRCP Regius Professor of Physic, University of Cambridge.
- Bunnell Henry Burton JP For political and public services in Ipswich.
- Albert Clavering. For political and public services.
- Edmund Frank Crane. For political and public services in Birmingham.
- Edwin Deller Principal of the University of London.
- Walter Forrest JP Member of Parliament for Pontefract, 1919-1922, and for Batley and Morley, 1924-1929. For political and public services.
- Cyril Fred Fox Director of the National Museum of Wales.
- Henry Holman Gregory KC Recorder of the City of London.
- Ernest Sidney Walter Hart MBE Chairman of the Society of Clerks of the Peace. Clerk of the Peace for Middlesex and Clerk to the Middlesex County Council.
- Major Samuel Emile Harvey JP MP Member of Parliament for Totnes, 1922-1923, and since 1924. For political and public services.
- Captain Evan Jones. For political and public services in North Wales.
- Alderman Sidney Guy Kimber JP For public services to Southampton.
- Wilfred Creyke King, Chairman and Managing Director of the Exchange Telegraph Company Limited.
- William Martineau, Chairman of Ross and Cromarty Unionist Association. For political and public services.
- Fred Denby Moore JP For political and public services in Yorkshire.
- John Boyd Orr DSO MC FRS Director, Rowett Institute for Research in Animal Nutrition, Aberdeen. For services to agriculture.
- Lieutenant-Colonel Thomas Gibson Poole VD JP For public services to Middlesbrough.
- Edward Bagnall Poulton FRS Honorary Life President of the Royal Entomological Society of London. Emeritus Professor of Zoology in the University of Oxford.
- Colonel John Joseph Shute CMG DSO TD JP DL MP For public, social and political services in Lancashire, particularly in Liverpool.
- John Donald Sutherland CBE FRSE (lately Colonel, R.E.), lately Assistant Forestry Commissioner for Scotland. Member of the Forestry Commission.
- Alexander Brown Swan, Lord Provost of Glasgow.
- William John Talbot. For political and public services in Walsall.
- Donald Francis Tovey FRSE Reid Professor of Music, University of Edinburgh.
- John Wallace MP Member of Parliament for Dunfermline District of Burghs, 1918-1922, and since 1931. For political and public services.

Colonies, Protectorates, etc.

- Major-General Thomas Albert Blamey CB CMG DSO Chief Commissioner of Police, State of Victoria. For services in connection with the Centenary Celebrations.
- Walter Buchanan-Smith CMG MC Lieutenant-Governor, Southern Provinces, Nigeria.
- Henry Sinclair Campbell Budge CMG Official Secretary to the Governor of the State of New South Wales.
- Andrew Caldecott CMG CBE Colonial Secretary, Straits Settlements.
- The Honourable Joseph Andrew Chisholm, Chief Justice of Nova Scotia, Dominion of Canada.
- Raphael West Cilento Senior Medical Officer, Department of Health, Commonwealth of Australia.
- Charles William Doorly CBE Administrator, St. Lucia, Windward Islands.
- Colin Fraser, For public services in the Commonwealth of Australia.
- Brigadier Carl Herman Jess CMG CBE DSO For services in connection with the organisation of the Centenary Celebrations of the State of Victoria.
- Major William Chollerton Lead MC Member of the Legislative Council of the Tanganyika Territory.
- Clutha Nantes Mackenzie, Director of the Institute for the Blind, Dominion of New Zealand.
- Ernest Cooper Riddle, Governor of the Commonwealth Bank, Commonwealth of Australia.
- Percy Rolfe Sargood. For public services in the Dominion of New Zealand.
- Colin Campbell Stephen, of Sydney, State of New South Wales, Chairman of the Australian Jockey Club.
- Samuel Joyce Thomas, Chief Justice, Federated Malay States.

British India

- Justice John Douglas Young, Barrister-at-Law, Chief Justice of the High Court of Judicature at Lahore, Punjab.
- Gokul Chand Narang Minister for Local Self-Government to the Governor of the Punjab.
- Lieutenant Colonel Clendon Turberville Daukes CIE of the Political Department, His Majesty's Envoy Extraordinary and Minister Plenipotentiary at the Court of Nepal.
- Justice Manmatha Nath Mukerji, Puisne Judge of the High Court of Judicature at Fort William, Calcutta, Bengal.
- Justice Charles Henry Bayley Kendall, Indian Civil Service, Puisne Judge of the High Court of Judicature at Allahabad, United Provinces.
- Nawab Malik Muhammad Hayat Khan Noon CSI lately Commissioner in the Punjab.
- Khan Bahadur Muhammad Bazl-ul-Lah Sahib Bahadur CIE OBE Chairman, Madras Services Commission, Madras.
- James Williamson, Agent, Bengal and North-Western Railway, Gorakhpur, United Provinces.
- William Leonard Stampe CIE Indian Service of Engineers, Chief Engineer, Irrigation Branch, Public Works Department, United Provinces.
- Lieutenant-Colonel Jamshedji Nasarvanji Duggan CIE OBE Professor of Ophthalmic Medicine and Surgery, Grant Medical College, Bombay, and Superintendent, C.J. Ophthalmic Hospital, Bombay.
- Patrick Robert Cadell CSI CIE VD Indian Civil Service (retired), Prime Minister of Junagadh State, Western India States Agency.
- Walter Merry Craddock DSO MC Senior Partner, Messrs. Place Siddons and Gough, and lately Sheriff of Calcutta, Bengal.
- John Robertson Abercrombie MC Director of Messrs. Wilson, Latham & Co., Bombay.
- Robert Graham, Chairman of the Indian Tea Association, London.

=== The Most Noble Order of the Garter ===
==== Knight of the Most Noble Order of the Garter (KG) ====
- The Right Honourable Charles Alfred Worsley, Earl of Yarborough.

=== The Most Honourable Order of the Bath ===
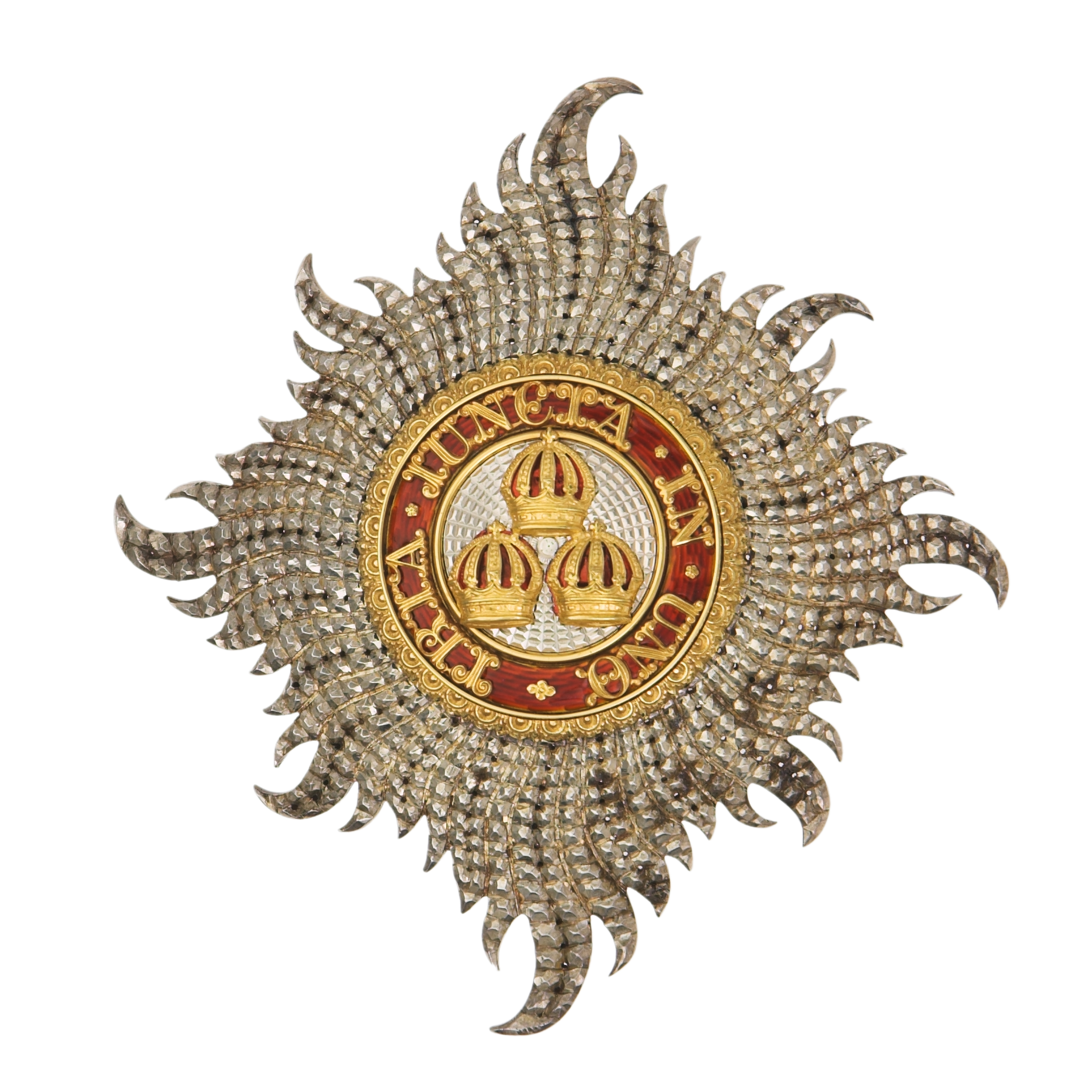
Civil star of the Knight Grand Cross of the Order of the Bath

==== Knight Grand Cross of the Order of the Bath (GCB) ====
Military Division
Army

- General Sir David Graham Muschet Campbell KCB Colonel, 9th Queen's Royal Lancers, Aide-de-Camp General to The King, Governor and Commander-in-Chief, Malta, and its Dependencies.
- General Sir Cecil Francis Romer KCB KBE CMG (late The Royal Dublin Fusiliers), Adjutant-General to the Forces, The War Office.
- General Sir Cyril Norman MacMullen KCB CMG CIE DSO Indian Army, Aide-de-Camp General to The King, General Officer Commanding-in-Chief, Eastern Command, India.

Civil Division

- Sir Josiah Stamp CBE FBA For public services.

==== Knight Commander of the Order of the Bath (KCB) ====
Military Division
Royal Navy

- Vice-Admiral the Honourable Matthew Robert Best CB DSO MVO
- Vice-Admiral Edward Ratcliffe Garth Russell Evans CB DSO

Army

- Lieutenant-General Harry Hugh Sidney Knox CB DSO Colonel, The Northamptonshire Regiment, Half-Pay, Lieutenant, The Tower of London, Adjutant General to the Forces, designate.
- Lieutenant-General Charles Bonham-Carter CB CMG DSO (late The Queen's Own Royal West Kent Regiment), Director-General of the Territorial Army, The War Office.
- Major-General Harry Beauchamp Douglas Baird CB CMG CIE DSO Indian Army, Commander, Deccan District, Southern Command, India.

Royal Air Force

- Air Marshal Sir John Miles Steel KBE CB CMG

Civil Division

- Brigadier-General Godfrey Davenport Goodman CB CMG DSO VD TD DL ADC Chairman, Territorial Army Association of the County of Derby.
- Henry John Fanshawe Badeley CBE FSA Clerk of the Parliaments, House of Lords.
- Colonel (Thomas Macdonald) Donald Banks CB DSO MC Director-General, General Post Office.

==== Companion of the Order of the Bath (CB) ====
Military Division
Royal Navy

- Rear-Admiral Edward Oliver Brudenell Seymour Osborne DSO
- Rear-Admiral James Fownes Somerville DSO
- Engineer Rear-Admiral Robert Beeman CMG

Army

- Major-General James Fitzgerald Martin CMG CBE KStJ (late Royal Army Medical Corps), Honorary Surgeon to The King, Deputy Director of Medical Services, Western Command, India.
- Major-General George Fleming CBE DSO (late The Somerset Light Infantry (Prince Albert's)), Commander, Madras District, Southern Command, India.
- Major-General Walter King Venning CMG CBE MC (late The Duke of Cornwall's Light Infantry), Director of Movements and Quartering, The War Office.
- Major-General Archibald Percival Wavell CMG MC (late The Black Watch (Royal Highlanders)), Half-Pay, General Officer Commanding 2nd Division, designate.
- Major-General Denis John Charles Kirwan Bernard CMG DSO (late The Rifle Brigade (Prince Consort's Own)), Director of Recruiting and Organization, The War Office.
- Major-General Clive Gerard Liddell CMG CBE DSO (late The Leicestershire Regiment), Half-Pay, General Officer Commanding 47th (2nd London) Division, Territorial Army, designate.
- Major-General Robert Knox Hezlet CBE DSO (late Royal Artillery), Director of Artillery, Headquarters Staff of the Army in India.
- Colonel (temporary Brigadier) Harold St. John Loyd Winterbotham CMG DSO (late Royal Engineers), Aide-de-Camp to The King, Director-General of Ordnance Survey, Ministry of Agriculture and Fisheries.
- Colonel (temporary Brigadier) James Clendinning Browne CMG DSO (late Royal Army Service Corps), Aide-de-Camp to The King, Brigadier in charge of Administration, The British Troops in Egypt.
- Colonel (honorary Brigadier-General) William Denman Croft CMG DSO (late The Cameronians (Scottish Rifles), and Royal Tank Corps), Retired Pay, late Commander, Nowshera Brigade, Northern Command, India.
- Major-General Edward Merivale Steward OBE Indian Army, Director of Supplies and Transport, Headquarters Staff of the Army in India.
- Major-General Chauncy Batho Dashwood Strettell, Indian Army, Brigadier, General Staff, Southern Command, India.
- Colonel (temporary Brigadier) Macan Saunders DSO Indian Army, Aide-de-Camp to The King, Commander, Delhi (Independent) Brigade Area, Eastern Command, India.
- Colonel (temporary Brigadier) Francis Lothian Nicholson DSO MC Colonel, 1st Battalion (Prince of Wales's Own), 17th Dogra Regiment, Indian Army, Director of Personal Services and Pay and Pensions, Headquarters Staff of the Army in India.
- Major-General Andrew George Latta McNaughton CMG DSO Chief of the General Staff of the Dominion of Canada.

Royal Air Force

- Air Vice-Marshal William Gore Sutherland Mitchell CBE DSO MC AFC
- Air Commodore Charles Edward Henry Rathborne DSO

Civil Division

- Rear-Admiral Murray Pipon CMG MVO OBE
- Rear-Admiral Everard John Hardman-Jones OBE
- Rear-Admiral Charles Edward Kennedy-Purvis
- Colonel Thomas Blatherwick DSO MC TD Territorial Army.
- Colonel Henry Jackson Kinghorn TD DL Territorial Army (Retired)
- Colonel Kenneth Hugh Munro Connal OBE TD DL Military Member of the Territorial Army and Air Force Association of the County of the City of Glasgow
- Major Charles Edward Etches OBE Secretary, National Rifle Association
- Arthur Sefton-Cohen, Assistant Director of Public Prosecutions
- John Herbert McCutcheon Craig, Principal Assistant Secretary, Treasury
- John Elborn Highton, Secretary, Department of Health for Scotland
- Gerard Robert Hill, Parliamentary Counsel
- William Alfred Thomas Shorto CBE Principal Assistant Secretary, Admiralty

=== The Most Exalted Order of the Star of India ===
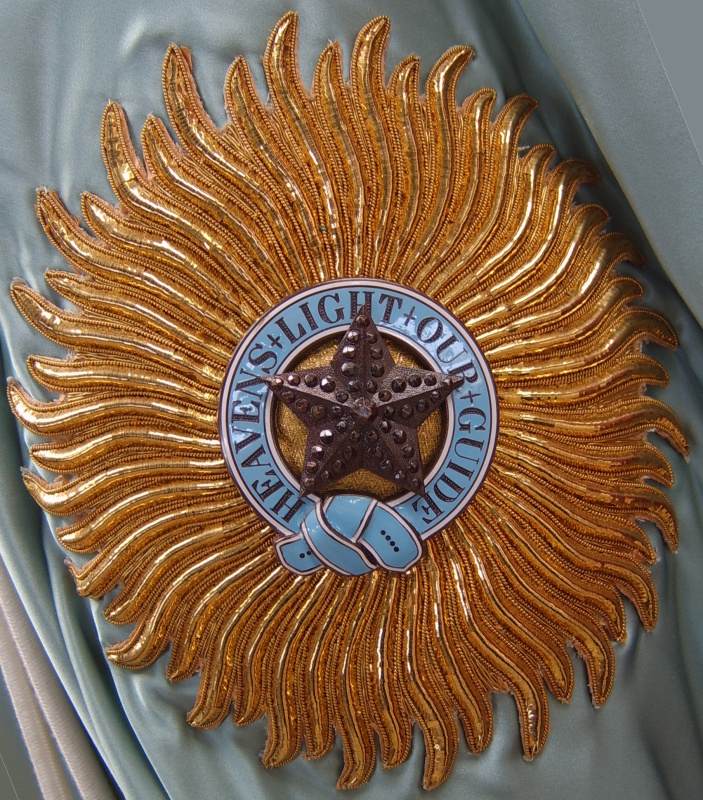
Star of a Knight Grand Commander of the Most Exalted Order of the Star of India.

==== Knight Grand Commander (GCSI) ====
Honorary Knight Grand Commander

- Lieutenant-General His Highness Ojaswi Rajanya Projjwala Nepala Tara Ati Pravala Gorkha Dakshina Bahu Prithuladheesha Sri Sri Sri Maharaja Sir Juddha Shumsher Jang Bahadur Rana GCIE Honorary Colonel of all Gurkha Rifle Regiments in the Indian Army, Prime Minister and Supreme Commander-in-Chief, Nepal.

==== Knight Commander (KCSI) ====
- His Highness Maharaja Bhom Pal Deo Bahadur Yadukul Chandra Bhal, Maharaja of Karauli, Rajputana.

==== Companion (CSI) ====
- Vincent Hart, Indian Service of Engineers, Chief Engineer, Public Works Department, Madras.

=== Order of Merit (OM) ===
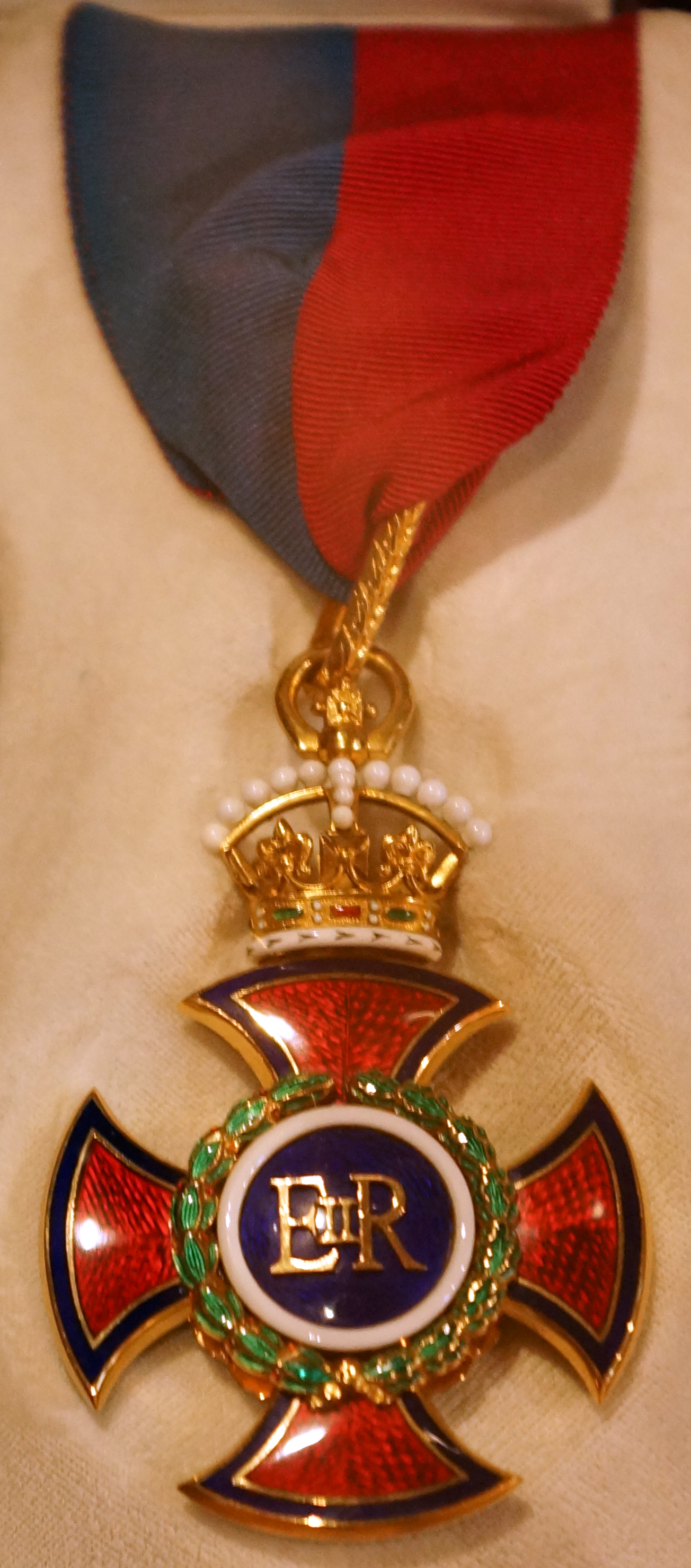
The riband and badge of the Order of Merit

- Professor John William Mackail

=== The Most Distinguished Order of Saint Michael and Saint George ===
Star of the Order of Saint Michael and Saint George.

==== Knight Grand Cross of the Order of St Michael and St George (GCMG) ====
- Sir Edward Brandis Denham KCMG KBE Captain-General and Governor-in-Chief of the Island of Jamaica and its Dependencies.

==== Knight Commander of the Order of St Michael and St George (KCMG) ====
- Bryan Hugh Fell CB lately Principal Clerk, Public Bill Office, House of Commons, and Clerk of the Fees.
- Lieutenant-General Sir William Thomas Furse KCB DSO Director of the Imperial Institute.
- Colonel Albert Edward Gooderham. For patriotic and philanthropic services in the Dominion of Canada.
- Archibald John Kerr Clark Kerr, His Majesty's Envoy Extraordinary and Minister Plenipotentiary at Stockholm.
- Arthur Charles Cosmo Parkinson CMG OBE Assistant Under-Secretary of State, Colonial Office.
- Albert Cherbury David Rivett Deputy Chairman and Chief Executive Officer of the Council of Scientific and Industrial Research, Commonwealth of Australia.
- Sir Wilfrid Wentworth Woods Kt CMG lately Financial Secretary, Ceylon.

Honorary Knight Commander

- Sir Abdul Karim bin Fadhl bin Ali KCIE Sultan of Lahej.

==== Companion of the Order of St Michael and St George (CMG) ====
- Wilfrid George Adams, Provincial Commissioner, Uganda Protectorate.
- Captain Leighton Seymour Bracegirdle DSO Military Secretary and Official Secretary to the Governor-General of the Commonwealth of Australia.
- William Kenneth Hunter Campbell, Officer of Class I of the Ceylon Civil Service.
- Lieutenant-Colonel Clive Lancaster Carbutt, Chief Native Commissioner, Southern Rhodesia.
- Shirley Eales CBE Administrative Secretary to the High Commissioner for South Africa.
- Frank Leonard Engledow Professor of Agriculture, Cambridge University, and Member of the Colonial Advisory Council of Agriculture and Animal Health.
- Harold Fairburn, Inspector General of Police, Straits Settlements.
- Rupert William Hemsted OBE For services as a member of the Kenya Land Commission.
- Thomas St. Quintin Hill OBE Assistant Secretary, Commercial Relations and Treaties Department, Board of Trade.
- Lieutenant-Colonel Sydney Price James FRS Medical Officer and Adviser on Tropical Diseases, Ministry of Health, and Member of the Colonial Advisory Medical Committee.
- William Ernest Jones MRCS Director of Mental Hygiene, State of Victoria.
- Robert Alsop Kelly, Treasurer, Gold Coast.
- George Arthur Lewin, Town Clerk of the City of Dunedin, Dominion of New Zealand.
- Eric Gustav Machtig OBE Assistant Secretary, Dominions Office.
- George Douglas Owen, Colonial Secretary, Barbados.
- Herbert Septimus Scott Director of Education, Kenya.
- Malcolm Lindsay Shepherd ISO Secretary, Department of Defence, Commonwealth of Australia.
- Herbert Harry Sterling, Chairman, Government Railway Board, Dominion of New Zealand.
- John Clarence Webster CM FRCP FACS FRS Author, Archivist and member of the Historic Sites and Monuments Board of the Dominion of Canada.
- Henry Wise Wood For services to agriculture in Western Canada.
- Captain Frank O'Brien Wilson DSO For services as a member of the Kenya Land Commission.
- Owen George Revell Williams, Assistant Secretary, Colonial Office.
- Alexander Wigram Allen Leeper CBE Counsellor, Foreign Office.
- Albert Guy Pawson, lately Governor of the Upper Nile Province, Sudan.

Honorary Companions

- Hasan dan Mu'azu Ahmadu, Sultan of Sokoto, Nigeria.
- His Highness Tunku Mohamed ibni Sultan Abdul Hamid Halimshah, Raja Muda and Regent designate of Kedah, Malay States.

=== Order of the Indian Empire ===
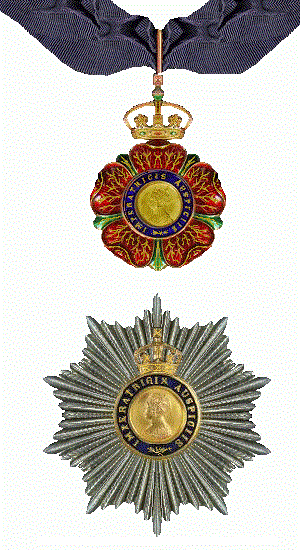
Riband, badge and star of the Knight Grand Commander of the Order of the Indian Empire

==== Knight Grand Commander (GCIE) ====
- His Highness Maharajadhiraja Raj Rajeshwar Sawai Shri Yashwant Rao Holkar Bahadur, Maharaja of Indore, Central India.
- His Highness Maharaja Sri Rama Varma, Maharaja of Cochin, Madras States.

==== Knight Commander (KCIE) ====
- His Highness Nawab Jalaluddin Khan Bismillah Khan Babi, Nawab of Radhanpur, Western India States.
- Maharaja Pratap Chandra Bhanja Deo, Maharaja of Mayurbhanj, Eastern States.
- Sir Alfred Alan Lethbridge Parsons CIE Indian Civil Service (retired), Member of the Council of India.
- Bertrand James Glancy CSI CIE of the Political Department, Political Secretary to the Government of India.
- Richard Henry Archibald Carter CB Assistant Secretary, India Office.

Honorary Knight Commander

- His Excellency Sheikh Hamad Bin Isa Al Khalifah CSI Sheikh of Bahrain, Persian Gulf.

==== Companion (CIE) ====
- Lieutenant-Colonel Donald Moyle Field, of the Political Department, Agent to the Governor-General, Madras States.
- Geoffrey Pownall Burton, Indian Civil Service, Commissioner, Jubbulpore, Central Provinces.
- Rai Bahadur Daya Ram Sahni Archaeological Survey of India, Director-General of Archaeology in India.
- Sardar Gangadharrao Narayanrao Mujumdar, 1st Class Sardar of the Deccan, Poona District, Bombay.
- Roger Gordon McDowall, Indian Civil Service, Reforms Secretary to the Government of Burma.
- Colonel Arthur James Glover Bird DSO Assistant Commandant, Indian Military Academy, Dehra Dun.
- Frederick Tymms MC Director of Civil Aviation in India.
- Frederick John Waller, Indian Service of Engineers, Chief Engineer and Secretary to the Government of the Punjab, Public Works Department (Irrigation Branch).
- Maurice Robert Richardson, Indian Service of Engineers, Officiating Chief Engineer, Irrigation Branch, Public Works Department, United Provinces.
- Basil Camden Prance, Indian Civil Service (retired), District Magistrate of Dacca, Bengal.
- Leonard Glyde Lavington Evans, of the Political Department, Political Agent, Eastern Rajputana States.
- Muhammad Saleh Akbar Hydari, Indian Civil Service, Deputy Secretary to the Government of India in the Department of Education, Health and Lands.
- Ian Melville Stephens, Director of Public Information, Government of India.
- Khan Bahadur Muhammad Abdul Mumin MLC lately Commissioner of the Chittagong Division, Bengal.
- Edward Mathison Souter MLC Managing Director, Messrs. Ford and Macdonald, Ltd., Cawnpore, United Provinces.
- Babu Chandreshvar Prashad Narayan Sinha MLC Zamindar, Bihar and Orissa.
- Lieutenant-Colonel Edward Selby Phipson DSO Indian Medical Service, Civil Administrative Medical Officer, Health Officer of the Port of Aden and Medical Officer, European General Hospital, Aden.
- Lieutenant-Colonel John Powell OBE VD Honorary Magistrate, Rawalpindi, Punjab.
- Lieutenant-Colonel (Honorary Colonel) Arnold Bellamy Beddow VD Commandant, Surma Valley Light Horse, Manager, Urnabund Tea Estate, Cachar, Assam.
- Charles Gordon Barber MBE , Indian Service of Engineers, Superintendent of Works, Cauvery-Mettur Project, Public Works Department, Madras.
- Phanindra Nath Mitra, Postmaster-General, Central Provinces.
- Alan Douglas Crombie, Indian Civil Service, Private Secretary to His Excellency the Governor of Madras.
- Major Henry James Rice MC Indian Medical Service, Indian Military Hospital, Poona, attached to the Royal Deccan Horse.
- Robert Boyd MacLachlan MInstCE Indian Service of Engineers, Executive Engineer, Bombay.
- John Gilbert Laithwaite, Principal, India Office.
- Colin Keppel Davidson OBE of the Committee Office, House of Lords.
- Thomas Clarke Crawford, of Messrs. James Finlay & Co., Planter and ex-President of the Tea Association, Calcutta.
- Khan Bahadur Darabshah Edalji Nagarwala, Chairman of the Bench of Honorary Magistrates and President of the City Municipality, Ahmednagar, Bombay.

=== The Imperial Order of the Crown of India ===
- Her Highness the Maharani Bhatianiji Sri Ajab Kan warji Sahib, of Bikaner, Rajputana.
- The Lady Beatrix Taylour Stanley CBE (wife of the Right Honourable Sir George Frederick Stanley GCSI GCIE CMG lately Governor of Madras).

=== The Royal Victorian Chain ===
- Edward George Villiers, Earl of Derby KG PC GCB
- Major-General Alexander Augustus Frederick William Alfred George, Earl of Athlone KG PC GCB GCMG GCVO DSO

=== The Royal Victorian Order ===
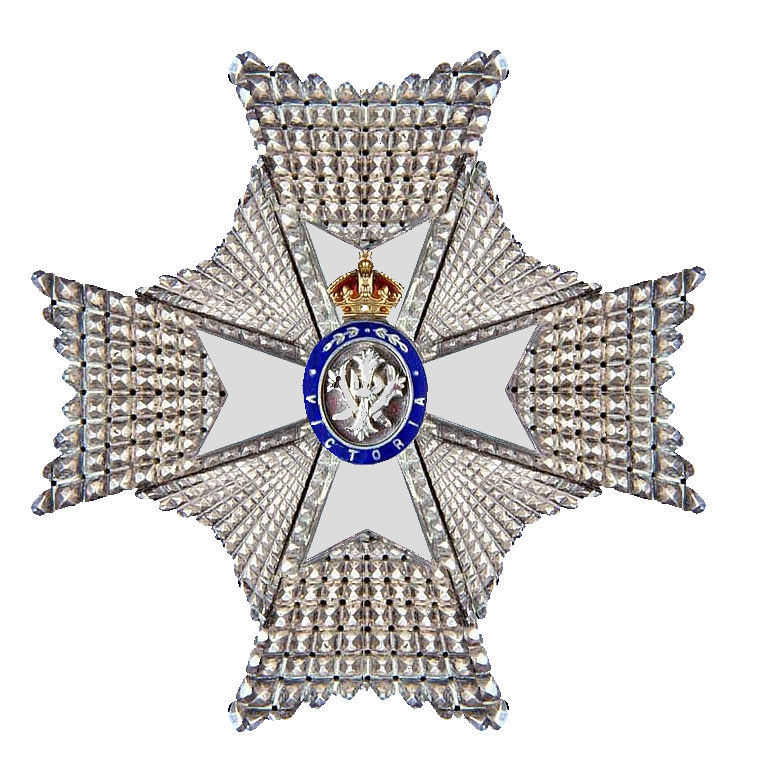
Insignia of a Knight / Dames Commander of the Royal Victorian Order

==== Knight Grand Cross of the Royal Victorian Order (GCVO) ====
- Admiral The Hon. Sir Herbert Meade-Fetherstonhaugh KCVO CB DSO ADC (Dated 16 August 1934.)
- Brigadier-General Thomas Walter, Viscount Hampden KCB CMG
- Charles Henry, Baron Leconfield.

==== Knight Commander of the Royal Victorian Order (KCVO) ====
- The Very Reverend William Foxley Norris CVO Dean of Westminster. (Dated 29 November 1934.)
- Lieutenant-General Charles John Cecil Grant CB DSO (Dated 12 December 1934.)
- George Redston Warner CMG (Dated 14 December 1934.)
- Sir Gerald Woods Wollaston MVO
- Colonel Sir Robert Arthur Johnson KBE TD
- Lieutenant-Colonel Reginald Henry Seymour CVO
- Lieutenant-Colonel Percy Robert Laurie CBE DSO
- William Reid Dick RA
- Edmund Ivens Spriggs

==== Commander of the Royal Victorian Order (CVO) ====
- Roderick Ross CBE (Dated 16 July 1934.)
- Major Algar Henry Stafford Howard MC
- Captain Harry George Adams-Connor MVO
- Nigel Bruce Ronald CMG
- Guy Capper Birt.

==== Member of the Royal Victorian Order, 4th class (MVO) ====
- Commander Oliver Loudon Gordon RN (Dated 12 August 1934.)
- Lieutenant-Commander Eric Perceval Hinton RN (Dated 12 August 1984.)
- The Reverend Arthur Rose Fuller.
- Derek Edward Hugh Wynter.
- John Henske Milanes.

==== Member of the Royal Victorian Order, 5th class (MVO) ====
- Superintendent William George Cole, Metropolitan Police. (Dated 21 December 1934.)
- Major George Frederick Thomas Hopkins MC
- Major Andrew Harris.
- William Reginald Busbridge MBE

=== The Most Excellent Order of the British Empire ===
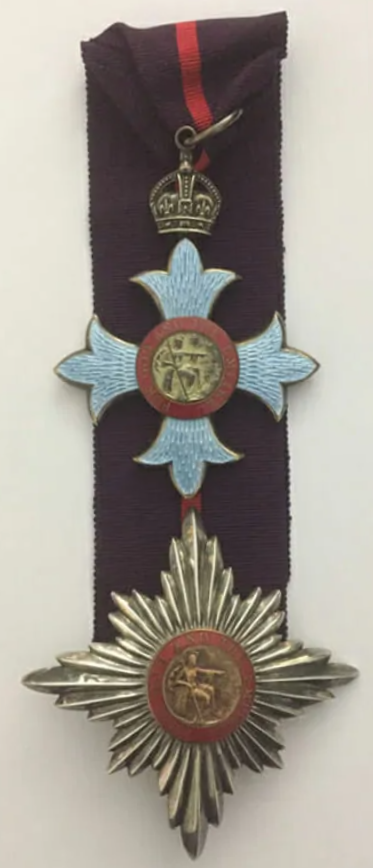
Knight Commander of the Order of the British Empire, insignia 1917–35

==== Knight Commander of the Order of the British Empire (KBE) ====
Civil Division
Colonies, Protectorates, etc.

- Charles William Lindsay. For philanthropic and charitable services in the Dominion of Canada.
- Sir Macpherson Robertson. For philanthropic services in the State of Victoria.

Honorary Knight Commander

- His Highness Tunku Mahmud ibni almarhum Sultan Ahmad Tajuddin CMG Acting Regent of Kedah, Malay States.

==== Commander of the Order of the British Empire (CBE) ====
Military Division
Royal Navy

- The Venerable Archdeacon Charles John Eyre Peshall DSO RN
- Captain Leslie Jennings Lucas Hammond RN (Retired).

Army

- Colonel (temporary Brigadier) William Henry Pferinger Elkins DSO The Royal Canadian Artillery, Commandant, Royal Military College of Canada.
- Colonel Cecil Vivian Staveley Jackson, Half-Pay, late Royal Engineers, late Commander, Royal Engineers, Waziristan District, India, for especially valuable services in connection with the construction of the road from Ladha to Wana.

Civil Division

- Edgar Johnson Allen FRS Secretary of the Marine Biological Association of the United Kingdom and Director of the Plymouth Laboratory.
- Charles John Balaam OBE Divisional Controller, South Eastern Division, Ministry of Labour.
- Catherine Chisholm Consulting Physician at the Manchester Northern Hospital for Women and Children.
- Lady Augusta Spencer-Churchill OBE Chairman of the Women's Section of the British Legion.
- Cleveland Fyfe, General Secretary, National Farmers Union.
- Martin Hardie, Keeper, Victoria and Albert Museum. Member of the Council of the Royal Society of Painter-Etchers.
- Charles Caesar Hawkins, lately Superintendent, Department of Technology, City and Guilds of London Institute. For services to technical education.
- Councillor Walter Ernest Loweth JP For political and public services in Hackney.
- Augustus Frank Pool OBE Deputy Chief Inspector of Taxes, Board of Inland Revenue.
- Harold Vezey Raffety OBE Chief Land Commissioner, Ministry of Agriculture and Fisheries.
- Herbert Alker Tripp, Assistant Commissioner Metropolitan Police.
- David Llewelyn Williams MC FRCSE Medical Officer, Welsh Board of Health.

Diplomatic Service and Overseas List

- Major Robert Ernest Cheesman OBE lately His Majesty's Consul for North West Ethiopia.
- Ebenezer Thomas Ward OBE Engineer-in-Chief of the European Danube Commission.

Colonies, Protectorates, etc.

- George Lewis Aitken, Chairman of the Pastoralists Research Trust, Commonwealth of Australia.
- Henry Black, Chairman, Saskatchewan Relief Commission, Dominion of Canada.
- Pattie Deakin. For public services in the Commonwealth of Australia. (Appointment dated 29 December 1934.)
- Joseph-Ernest Grégoire, Mayor of Quebec City, Dominion of Canada.
- Wilfred Russell Grimwade. For services in connection with the Centenary Celebrations of the State of Victoria.
- Camillien Houde, Mayor, City of Montreal, Dominion of Canada.
- Albert Edmond Kane. For services in connection with the Centenary Celebrations of the State of Victoria.
- William James Kessell, Public Trustee, State of New South Wales.
- John Stanley Plaskett FRS Director of Astrophysical Observatory, Dominion of Canada.
- Captain Robert O'Malley Reilly, Assistant Resident Commissioner, Bechuanaland Protectorate.
- William James Stewart, Mayor, City of Toronto, Dominion of Canada.
- Harold Cholmley Mansfield Austen OBE General Manager of Railways, Mauritius.
- Walter Eraut MICE Chief Engineer, Contracts Branch, Crown Agents for the Colonies.
- Captain Leonard Joseph Hall OBE RD RNR (Retired), Director of Marine, Nigeria.
- Charles Ramsdale Lockhart, Treasurer, Northern Rhodesia.
- Harcourt Gladstone Malcolm OBE KC Speaker of the House of Assembly, Bahamas.
- Edward Keith-Roach OBE District Commissioner, Palestine.

Honorary Commanders

- Ademola II, Alake of Abeokuta, Nigeria.
- The Dato Penghulu Mendika Mentri Akhirzaman Abdullah bin Panglima Muda, Undang of Jelebu, Federated Malay States.

==== Officer of the Order of the British Empire (OBE) ====
Military Division
Royal Navy

- Commander Thomas Garland Harrison RN
- Lieutenant-Commander Edmund Hugh Hopkinson RN
- Lieutenant-Commander Henry Antony Simpson DSC RN
- Surgeon Commander (D) Walter Cecil Murray RN
- Paymaster Commander John Alick Edward Woodhouse RN
- Paymaster Commander Richard Francis Durman RN
- Instructor Commander Morton Henry Moyes

Army

- Major (Commissary) Frederic William Addinall MBE India Miscellaneous List, Officer Supervisor, General Staff Branch, Army Headquarters, India.
- Lieutenant-Colonel George Duncan Ralph Black VD Reserve of Officers, Hong Kong Volunteer Defence Corps, late Principal Medical Officer, Hong Kong Volunteer Defence Corps.
- Lieutenant-Colonel George Osborne De Renzy Channer MC 1st Battalion, 3rd Queen Alexandra's Own Gurkha Rifles, Indian Army.
- Captain Ralph Alexander Byrne Cooper, 1st Battalion, The East Yorkshire Regiment, for valuable services rendered during the earthquake at Muzaffarpur, India, on the 15 January 1934.
- Captain Sydney Barrett Good, 5th Battalion (Queen Victoria's Own Corps of Guides), 12th Frontier Force Regiment, Indian Army, late Staff Captain, Nowshera Brigade.
- Major (Commissary) Arthur Rayner, Retired, late Indian Army Ordnance Corps, late Technical Officer, Directorate of Ordnance Services, Master-General of the Ordnance Branch, Army Headquarters, India.
- Major (temporary Lieutenant-Colonel) Victor Paul Hildebrand Stantke, Staff Corps, Australian Military Forces, Director of Mobilization, Department of the Adjutant-General, Australia.
- Captain Keith Lindsay Stewart MBE New Zealand Staff Corps, late Staff Officer, Ceylon Defence Force.

Royal Air Force

- Squadron-Leader Roy Stanley Grandy, Royal Canadian Air Force. For outstanding services in pioneering air mail routes.

Civil Division

- George Wesley Austin Principal Scientific Officer, R.N. Torpedo Factory, Greenock.
- Charles Pearsall Beech, Public Assistance Officer of the City of Birmingham.
- Thomas Henry Bishop, Chairman of Court of Referees for Derby since 1931.
- Charles Ernest Brackenbury, Assistant Head of Branch, Insurance Department, Ministry of Health.
- Mildred Frances Browne MBE Senior Staff Officer, Ministry of Pensions.
- Ernest William Butler, Chief Structural Engineer, H.M. Office of Works and Public Buildings.
- Major Robert George Clark MInstCE MIStructE Engineer to the Middle Level (Great Ouse Catchment Area) Drainage and Navigation Commissioners.
- William John Dorrell MBE Assistant Director of Sea Transport, Mercantile Marine Department, Board of Trade.
- Alderman John Benjamin Downing JP Chairman of the Dudley and District War Pensions Committee.
- Frederick Percy Edgar, Midland Regional Director, British Broadcasting Corporation.
- Major Michael Joseph Egan, Chief Constable of the Southport Borough Police.
- Colonel Gilbert Gunn. For political and public services in the Highlands of Scotland.
- John Joseph Hamilton, Deputy Chief Inspector, Board of Customs and Excise.
- Richard William Harris, Secretary, London School of Hygiene and Tropical Medicine.
- Thomas Howe, Principal, Ministry of Labour.
- Lieutenant-Colonel Louis Wentworth Johnson, Governor, Wormwood Scrubs Prison.
- Tom Bell Maxwell Lamb, lately H.M. Inspector of Schools, Scotland.
- Kenneth Lancelot Macaulay, Chief Accountant, Ministry of Transport.
- Moir Mackenzie, W. S., Divisional Manager (Empire Division) Federation of British Industries.
- Captain Arthur James Mayne MIEE Chief Electrical Engineer, Aldershot Command.
- Henry Herbert Mears, Head Postmaster, Southampton.
- Alderman John Robert Nuttall JP FRHistS Chairman, Lancaster Education Committee.
- John Parker JP Chairman of the Clydebank Employment Committee.
- William Owen Powell, Chief Constable, Metropolitan Police.
- John George Rhodes, Principal Finance Officer, Board of Education.
- Joseph Richard Roberts, lately Head Master, Cardiff High School for Boys.
- Robert Roulston JP Chairman of the Londonderry City and County Infirmary.
- Priscilla Sanderson, Matron, Mount Vernon Hospital (for Cancer), Northwood, Middlesex.
- Arthur Stephens. For political and public services in West Ham.
- John Everard Stephenson, Principal, Dominions Office.
- William Howard Williams-Treffgarne, Principal Clerk, Board of Inland Revenue.
- Lily Edith Warren. For political and public services in Croydon.
- Richard Albert Weaver, Superintending Engineer, North Wales District, General Post Office.

Diplomatic Service and Overseas List

- Major Leonard Henry Graystone Andrews, The Bedfordshire and Hertfordshire Regiment, Military Attache at His Majesty's Embassies at Rio de Janeiro and Santiago and at His Majesty's Missions at Lima and Quito.
- Percy Brigstocke MRCS LRCP Chief Medical Officer of the Victoria Hospital, Damascus.
- Eric Thomas Caparn MC Superintending Engineer, Public Works Department.
- Charles Cameron Day, a British resident at Rosario, Argentina.
- Andrew Holden, Deputy Director-General of the Direct Taxes Department, Egyptian Ministry of Finance.
- Harold Norman Sturrock, Commercial Secretary at His Majesty's Legation at Belgrade.

Colonies, Protectorates, etc.

- Edwin Albert Baker MC Managing Director of the Institute for the Blind, Dominion of Canada. For services to blind ex-servicemen and their dependents.
- Major Joseph Cyril Brundell, Chief Superintendent, Criminal Investigation Department, Southern Rhodesia.
- William Caven, lately Inspector of Excise, Dominion of Canada.
- Flying Officer Clennell Haggerston Dickins. For services in the development of civil aviation in the Dominion of Canada.
- Edna Mary Guest Chief of Department of Surgery, Women's College Hospital, Toronto, Dominion of Canada. For voluntary services as Medical Adviser, Women's Organisations.
- Jean Isabel Gunn, Superintendent of Nurses, Toronto General Hospital, Dominion of Canada.
- Mabel Frances Hersey, Superintendent of Nurses, Royal Victoria Hospital, Dominion of Canada.
- Howard Hinton, Trustee of the National Art Gallery of the State of New South Wales.
- The Reverend Sidney Elijah Lambert, President, Amputations Association of the Great War, Dominion of Canada. For services to ex-servicemen and their dependents.
- Flight-Lieutenant Wilfrid Reid May DFC Royal Canadian Air Force (Reserve of Officers). For numerous mercy flights to outlying points in North Western Canada.
- Daniel Mclntyre lately Superintendent of Winnipeg Public Schools, Dominion of Canada.
- Albert Reginald McLeod Chief Staff Officer, St. John's Ambulance Brigade, State of New South Wales.
- Albert Millin, Member of the Advisory Council, Swaziland.
- Thomas Sydney Nettlefold. For services in connection with the Centenary Celebrations of the State of Victoria.
- Charles Arthur Norris. For public services in the State of Victoria.
- Frederick Linwood Clinton Pereira, Assistant Secretary to the Governor-General of the Dominion of Canada.
- Georges-Henri Robichon, Mayor, City of Three Rivers, Dominion of Canada.
- John Thomas Ross lately Deputy Minister of Education, Dominion of Canada.
- James William Somers, Clerk of the City of Toronto, Dominion of Canada.
- Jennie Webster, lately Superintendent, Montreal General Hospital, Dominion of Canada.
- The Venerable John Henry Briggs, Archdeacon of Ugogo, in the Diocese of Central Tanganyika.
- Captain Christopher Wilson Brown MC Director of Public Works, Sierra Leone.
- The Venerable Dandeson Coates Crowther Archdeacon of the Niger.
- Joseph Welsh Park Harkness Deputy Director, Department of Health, Palestine.
- Charles Alexander Holmes, Commissioner of Lands, Fiji.
- Henry Randolph Howes, Unofficial Member of the General Legislative Council of the Leeward Islands.
- Albert Victor Laferla Director of Education, Malta.
- Eric Stanley Marillier, Controller of Customs, Northern Rhodesia.
- Major Philip Edwin Matthews MBE Superintendent of Police, British Honduras.
- Alfred Edward Robert Mayne, Chief Accountant, Railways, Kenya and Uganda.
- Eric Laidley Mort Superintendent of Education, Nigeria.
- Thomas Mogford Partridge, Unofficial Member of the Legislative Council of the Nyasaland Protectorate.
- Alexander Edmund de Silva Wijegooneratne Samaraweera Rajepakse. For public services in Ceylon.
- Thomas Henderson Scott MICE City Engineer, Port of Spain, Trinidad.
- Edward Brathwaite Skeete, Member of the Legislative Council of Barbados.
- Percy Reginald Smith, Senior Deputy Postmaster-General, Tanganyika Territory.
- Reginald Hopkinson Smith, District Officer, Somaliland Protectorate.
- Bella, Lady Southern. For public services in Hong Kong.
- Arthur Walter Alfred Claude Tannahill. For public services in Kenya.
- Wee Swee Teow JP For public services in the Straits Settlements.
- Roland Wheeler MIEE City Electrical Engineer, Gibraltar.

British India

- Catherine, Lady Godwin (wife of Lieut. Gen. Sir Charles A. C. Godwin KCB CMG DSO Indian Army (retired)).
- Leslie Hugh Bartlett MLC Agent and General Manager, the Central Provinces Manganese Ore Company, Limited, Central Provinces.
- Vaughan Craster, Honorary Accountant of the Lady Minto's Indian Nursing Association (England).
- Major Frank Drummond Shuttleworth Field MC Indian Army, 5/11th Sikh Regiment (Duke of Connaught's Own), and lately First Commandant, Mewar State Forces, Rajputana.
- Vernon William Farquharson Hicks, Additional Superintendent of Police, Chittagong, Bengal.
- Rai Bahadur Lala Brij Kishore, Landowner, United Provinces.
- Douglas Stewart Macdonald, Cane Superintendent, Samastipur Sugar Mill, Bihar and Orissa.
- Michael Thomas O'Gorman, Indian Police, District Superintendent of Police, Satara, Bombay.
- Major Ahmad Khan Sahibzada (Bombay), Indian Medical Service, Civil Surgeon, Hazara, North-West Frontier Province.
- Girdhari Singh, Sardar Bahadur, Colonel in the Gwalior State Forces and Quartermaster-General, Gwalior Army.
- Kumar Gupteshwar Prasad Singh, of Jehanabad, Gaya District, Bihar and Orissa.
- Maurice Osborne Tanner, District Superintendent of Police, Tharrawaddy, Burma.

Honorary Officers

- Yacub Effendi Farraj, Vice-Mayor of Jerusalem, Palestine.

==== Member of the Order of the British Empire (MBE) ====
Military Division
Royal Navy

- Lieutenant Leonard Thomas Northcott RN
- Commissioned Gunner William George English RN
- Commissioned Shipwright William Henry Chubb RN
- Lieutenant (E) Stanley James Taverner RN
- Commissioned Royal Marine Gunner Reginald Maurice Yea RN
- Commissioned Bandmaster Joshua Ventry

Army

- Captain Abubakar bin Hadji Arshad; 2nd Battalion (Singapore Volunteer Corps), Straits Settlements Volunteer Force.
- Warrant Officer Class I, Regimental Sergeant-Major Wenceslas Bilodeau, Royal 22nd Regiment, Permanent Forces of the Dominion of Canada.
- Lieutenant John Henry Francis Collingwood, The Queen's Bays (2nd Dragoon Guards), attached Somaliland Camel Corps, The King's African Rifles.
- Warrant Officer, Class II, Company Sergeant-Major Harry Farrow, 1st Battalion, The Middlesex Regiment (Duke of Cambridge's Own), attached 3rd Battalion (Penang and Province Wellesley Volunteer Corps), Straits Settlements Volunteer Force.
- Major (Commissary) John Fosbury, Indian Army Corps of Clerks, Chief Clerk, Eastern Command, India.
- Major James Henry Green, 3rd Battalion, 20th Burma Rifles, Indian Army, late General Staff Officer, 3rd Grade, Burma District.
- Subadar Guman Sing Patwal, 3rd Battalion, 18th Royal Garhwal Rifles, Indian Army.
- Quarter-Master and Honorary Major William Martin Mackay, Instructional Corps, Australian Military Forces.
- Lieutenant Charles Maurice Salisbury Marsden, 1st Battalion, The East Yorkshire Regiment, for valuable services rendered during the earthquake at Muzaffarpur, India, on 15 January 1934.
- Major (Commissary) Matthew Mason, India Miscellaneous List, Officer Supervisor, Directorate of Contracts, Master-General of the Ordnance Branch, Army Headquarters, India.
- Captain Shadwell Keith Murray MC 3rd Battalion, 18th Royal Garhwal Rifles, Indian Army.

Royal Air Force

- Flight Lieutenant Alfred Alderson Poole RAAF

Civil Division

- John Hector Brebner, Press Officer, General Post Office.
- Ernald James Brentnall, Head Master, Lancaster Road Senior Boys School, Notting Hill, London.
- William Edward Counsell, First Class Officer, Ministry of Labour.
- Henry Albert Coward, Labour and Welfare Officer, H.M. Office of Works and Public Buildings.
- John William Curtis, Staff Officer, Tax Inspecting Branch, Board of Inland Revenue.
- Arthur Gust, Superintendent, St. Helens Borough Police.
- Richard Daly, Staff Officer, Ministry of Health.
- Irene Rachel Elmhirst, Organiser of Welfare Centres for the unemployed throughout the West Riding of Yorkshire.
- Reginald Mead Filmer FIC Technical Examining Officer, Admiralty (Royal Clarence) Victualling Yard, Gosport.
- William Fraser, Chief Constable, Dumbarton Burgh Police.
- Thomas George Gibbings JP Chairman of the Bermondsey and Southwark War Pensions Committee.
- Frederick William Gooseman, Senior Staff Officer, Ministry of Agriculture and Fisheries.
- Stanley Walter Green, Senior Staff Officer, Treasury.
- Edith Hampson JP Vice-Chairman of the Salford, Eccles and District War Pensions Committee and Chairman of the Children's Sub-Committee.
- Eliza Harper, for over twenty years Honorary Secretary of the Belfast Musical Competitions.
- Herbert Smith Hayes. For political and public services in Warrington and Birkenhead.
- John Lamond Henderson, Assistant Traffic Superintendent (Telegraphs), General Post Office.
- Annette Louise Henry, for public services. Lately a member of the Newbury Rural District Council.
- Andrew Stuart Hibberd, Senior Announcer, British Broadcasting Corporation.
- Jessie Mabel Holdway, Superintendent of Typists, War Office.
- Ernest Jones Holmes, Senior Inspector of Textile Particulars, Factory Department, Home Office.
- Josiah Whittaker Huss, Superintendent of the County Council of Durham Junior Instruction Centre for unemployed boys, Bishop Auckland.
- Edwin Payler Jones, Staff Clerk, War Office.
- Joseph Arthur Jones, Lately Sanitary Inspector in Wrexham Rural District, Denbighshire.
- George Kingman, Superintendent, Cheshire Constabulary.
- James Lauder, Superintendent, Metropolitan Police.
- Evelyn Rossell Lavington, Matron, Savernake Hospital, Wiltshire.
- Ernest Augustus Leal, First Class Examiner, Companies (Winding up) Department, Board of Trade.
- Edith Isobel Garnet Luke Principal Lecturer in Methods, Dundee Training Centre for Teachers.
- John McBurnie, Sheriff Clerk of the Eastern Division of the Sheriffdom of Dumfries and Galloway.
- James McClemens, Senior Vesturer at Canterbury Cathedral.
- James Macdonald, Chief Constable, Arbroath.
- Alderman Andrew McHugh JP Chairman of the North Northumberland War Pensions Committee, and of the Children's Sub-Committee.
- Donald Maclean, Public Assistance Officer, Greenock.
- Alexander Maclennan, Lately Provost of Stornoway.
- Edith Anna Marvin, Staff Officer for Establishment Duties, India Office.
- Geoffrey Harry Meadmore, Senior Intelligence Officer, Department of Overseas Trade.
- Alice Isabella Model, Honorary Secretary of the Jewish Maternity Hospital.
- Ernest Conrad Nash, Commander, Metropolitan Special Constabulary.
- Lieutenant-Colonel John Iltyd Dillwyn Nicholl JP DL Chairman of the Bridgend Bench of Magistrates, Glamorgan.
- David Watt Page, Higher Executive Officer (Assistant Ministry Representative in Canada), Ministry of Pensions.
- Samuel Pickering, Assistant Postmaster, Liverpool.
- Robert James Prince, Welfare Organiser and Supervisor for the Miners Welfare Fund in Lanarkshire coal mining district.
- Samuel Radmore, Higher Clerical Officer, Board of Education.
- Edward Stanley Shoults, Chairman, British Glasshouse Produce Marketing Association.
- Arthur James Simpson, First Class Clerk, Official Solicitor's Department, Supreme Court of Judicature.
- John Isaac Wyatt Stone, Works Overseer, Grade I, H.M. Stationery Office Printing Works.
- Elsie Vera Thomas, Clerical Officer, Foreign Office.
- Bertie Beavis Travess, Senior Stores and Accounts Officer, Directorate of Works and Buildings, Air Ministry.
- Arthur James Turner, lately Principal Clerk, Secretary's Office, General Post Office, Edinburgh.
- Lizzie Wakefield, Headmistress, Infants Department, St. Oswald's School, Hebburn, Co. Durham.
- Frederick Robert Ward JP For services in the administration of the Scilly Isles.
- William Self Weeks, Town Clerk of Clitheroe.

Diplomatic Service and Overseas List

- Marguerite Bucknall, a British resident at Lisbon.
- Spiro Gilibert, President of the Maltese Benevolent Society, Cairo.
- Edward Lamb, Archivist at His Majesty's Embassy at Buenos Aires.
- John Kindersley Maurice, District Commissioner, Sudan Political Service.
- Thomas McDonald, Clerical Officer at His Majesty's Sub-Legation at Nanking.
- Captain George Johnson Neill, British Vice-Consul at Rouen.
- Pericles Papadachi, British Vice-Consul at Corfu.
- Annie Georgina Snelgrove Matron at the Iraq Railways Hospital, Baghdad.
- Albert Rendle Stone, British Vice-Consul at Detroit.

Colonies, Protectorates, etc.

- Sergeant-Major Frederick Anderton, Royal Canadian Mounted Police. For distinguished service in Arctic, Sub-Arctic and Northern Canada.
- Robert Atkinson. For protecting and delivering mail under conditions of extreme hardship in the Dominion of Canada.
- Louis Bourassa. For protecting and delivering mail under conditions of extreme hardship in North Western Canada.
- Thomas Tofield Bower, lately Postmaster of Winnipeg, Dominion of Canada.
- John Reginald Bowler, General Secretary, the Canadian Legion of the British Empire Service League.
- William Joseph Carroll, lately Sheriff, Newfoundland.
- Charles Davis, Mayor of Gaspe, Dominion of Canada.
- Sarah Feeney. For services with the Grand Trunk and Canadian National Railways, Dominion of Canada.
- Alexander Jardine Hunter For services as missionary-physician in pioneer settlements of Manitoba, Dominion of Canada.
- Frances Hatton Eva Hasell, Honorary Organiser of Caravan work in Western Canada.
- Samuel Kennedy, Mayor of Charlottetown, Dominion of Canada.
- George Cliff King, lately Postmaster of Calgary, Dominion of Canada.
- John Henry King, President of the Royal Society of St. George, State of New South Wales.
- William Allan McKnight, Sub-Office Postmaster, Winnipeg, Dominion of Canada. For successfully withstanding, at great personal risk, the attack of armed bandits on Post Office property.
- Mary Emma Goldsmith Meares. For philanthropic services for ex-soldiers and their dependants in the Commonwealth of Australia.
- John Leo Mulrooney MVO Senior Clerk, Prime Minister's Department, Commonwealth of Australia.
- Helen Marion O'Donahoe, lately Chief Clerk, Department of Indian Affairs, Dominion of Canada.
- Amedee Robitaille. For protecting, at great personal risk, Post Office property in the Dominion of Canada.
- Mary Frederick Walters Robson. For social services in the Commonwealth of Australia.
- William Peter Rogerson, lately Deputy Minister, Marine and Fisheries, Newfoundland.
- Sveinn Thorvaldson. For services to Icelandic settlers in Manitoba, Dominion of Canada.
- Alice Evelyn Wilson Assistant Invertebrate Palaeontologist, Department of Mines, Dominion of Canada.
- Abdulkarim Alidina, Clerk, Customs Department, Tanganyika Territory.
- James Douglas Alleyne Port Health Officer, Barbados.
- Herbert Boon, Clerk to Administrator, St. Christopher and Nevis, Leeward Islands.
- Percy West Browne, lately Auditor-General, Barbados.
- Adam Webster Burgess, Senior Overseer, Public Works Department, Kenya.
- Edith Gwendoline Floissac. For public services in St. Lucia, Windward Islands.
- Aubrey Noel Francombe. For pioneer services to civil aviation in the Tanganyika Territory.
- Douglas Montagu Gane, Secretary and Treasurer of the Tristan da Cunha Fund.
- David Genower. For public services in Kenya.
- Syed Chulan Hassan, Veterinary Inspector, Kenya.
- John Denis Lenagan, Inspector of Constabulary, Trinidad.
- Anne Ellis Macmaster, Senior Nursing Sister, Sierra Leone.
- John Livingstone McPherson. For public services in Hong Kong.
- Ethel Mills. For services to education in Trinidad.
- The Very Reverend Father Henry Raphael Moulding Moss, Vicar-General of Grenada, Windward Islands.
- Sheikh Ali bin Mohamen Mkuu, Liwali of Lamu, Kenya.
- Leslie Kelway Pope, Port Manager, Jaffa, Palestine.
- William Ernest Pownall, Chief Clerk, Agricultural Department, Tanganyika Territory.
- The Reverend Canon George Loran Pyfrom. For public services in the Bahamas.
- Hannibal Publius Scicluna, Librarian, Public Library, Malta.
- Ioanni Michael Tilliro, Local Commandant of Police, Cyprus.
- Henry James Walker, Office Assistant to the Chief Engineer, Railways, Kenya and Uganda.

British India

- Sarah Nicoll-Jones, Organising Secretary of the Rangoon Vigilance Society and Honorary Sub-Inspector of Police, Rangoon Town Police, Burma.
- Julia Augusta West, Proprietress, Curtis & Co., Mandalay, Burma.
- M. R. Ry. Rao Bahadur Mayavaram Vandirajapuram Sabhapati Mudaliyar Vaidyanatha Mudaliyar Avargal, Deputy Superintendent of Police, Madras.
- Rai Bahadur Babu Brij Lai Badhwar MLC Managing Director of the Prem Spinning and Weaving Mills, Ujhani (Budaun), United Provinces.
- Babu Gopendra Nath Basu, Zamindar, Bihar and Orissa.
- Ajodhya Das, President of the Rural Boards, Gorakhpur, United Provinces.
- Lieutenant (Assistant Commissary) Claude Harry Fenner, Director of Music, His Excellency the Viceroy's Band.
- William George John Francis, Constructor, Royal Indian Navy Dockyard, Bombay.
- Arthur Charles Godfrey, Deputy Superintendent of Police, Central Provinces.
- Sagram Hebrom MLC leading Tribal Chief, Bihar and Orissa.
- Mervyn Armstrong Higgs, Indian Service of Engineers, Executive Engineer, Public Works Department, Irrigation Branch, United Provinces.
- Harold Eldric Hypher, Assistant Engineer, Bengal and North-Western Railway, Narkatiaganj, Bihar and Orissa.
- William Jacob Ingham AMIMechE Bombay Educational Service, Instructor to Normal Class and Superintendent of Workshops, College of Engineering, Poona, Bombay.
- Khan Bahadur Abdul Qadir Khan lately Civil Surgeon and Superintendent, Kohat Jail, North-West Frontier Province.
- Alan Sidney Lane, Chief Inspector of Aircraft, Civil Aviation Directorate.
- Henry Henning Lincoln, of the Imperial Secretariat Service, Assistant Secretary to the Government of India in the Department of Education, Health and Lands.
- Captain Frank Mayo MC Commandant, Sirmoor State Forces, Punjab States.
- Khan Bahadur Ghulam Nabishah Moujalishah MLC Zamindar, and President of the District Local Board, Tharparkar, Sind, Bombay.
- James Arthur Scarr, Deputy Conservator of the Port of Karachi, Bombay.
- Sardar Bahadur Sardar Harnam Singh, lately Deputy Superintendent of Police, Punjab.
- Babu Rameshwar Prashad Singh MLC Zamindar, Bihar and Orissa.
- Henry James Smyth, Assistant Engineer, Bengal and North-Western Railway, Dhang, Bihar and Orissa.
- Edward John Wright West, Personal Assistant to the Chief Engineer, Posts and Telegraphs.

Honorary Members

- Sheikh Muhammad Abdel Rahman Beidas. For public services in Palestine.
- Mirza Badi Bushrui, Administrative Officer, Palestine.
- Asaph Grasovsky, Senior Horticultural Officer, Palestine.
- Salih Ja'far Muhammad Salih Ja'far, Political Clerk, Hodeidah, Aden.

=== Kaisar-i-Hind Medal ===
First Class

- Brenda Cotesworth (wife of C. G. Cotesworth, Loco Superintendent, Bombay, Baroda and Central India Railway, Ajmer, Ajmer-Merwara.
- Margaret Edmondson Gibson (wife of Reymond Evelyn Gibson CIE Commissioner in Sind), Bombay.
- Margaret Mary Crick, Lady Irving (wife of Sir Miles Irving CIE OBE lately Financial Commissioner, Punjab).
- Margaret, Lady Page (wife of Sir Arthur Page, Chief Justice of Burma), Burma.
- Alice Henrietta, Lady Stokes (wife of Sir Hopetoun Stokes KCIE CSI Member of the Executive Council of the Governor of Madras), Madras.
- Reginald John Hands Cox, Church Missionary Society, Doctor-in-Charge of the Afghan Mission Hospital, Peshawar, North-
- West Frontier Province.
- Kottil Walappil Parameswara Marar Officiating Deputy Commissioner, Nowgong, Assam.
- The Reverend Arnold Claude Pelly, Principal, St. Andrew's College, Gorakhpur, United Provinces.
- Gottfried Oram Teichmann, Medical Missionary of the Baptist Mission, Chandraghona, Chittagong Hill Tracts, Bengal.

=== British Empire Medal (BEM) ===
Military Division
For Meritorious Service

- Chief Petty Officer Charles James Thurgill Hill, Royal Canadian Navy.
- Flight Sergeant Harry Johnson Winny, Royal Canadian Air Force.

Civil Division
For Gallantry

- Babu Ranjit Singh, Tehsildar, United Provinces, India. Citation: "When this Revenue Officer one night was in the neighbourhood of village Jharwan in the Saharanpur District he received information that a gang of twenty-five dacoits armed with short guns and lathis were attacking the house of a wealthy Bania. He collected four men and proceeded at once to the village and attacked the dacoits, his only weapon being a pistol. When two of his men had been wounded and his pistol had temporarily jammed, he continued to attack. Eventually, after wounding one of the dacoits, he succeeded in driving them off, and thus, by his prompt action and conspicuous bravery, was able to stop a very serious dacoity."
- Albert Rienzi de Livera, Inspector, Mount Lavinia Police Station, Ceylon. Citation: "For conspicuous courage in arresting a notorious criminal who after assaulting a man named Romiel Perera, had tied him to a tree and had threatened to stab any.one attempting a rescue. No one else had dared to approach the criminal who was armed with a chopper, and on seeing the Police party, advanced towards the Inspector but changing his mind cut Romiel Perera, on the side of the neck. Before he could repeat the blow, Inspector de Livera was on him, and after a severe struggle in which the man also attacked the Inspector and a Constable with a kris knife the Inspector disarmed him and took him into custody. Romiel Perera was bleeding profusely from a gaping wound on the left side of the neck which had completely severed an artery. Inspector de Livera immediately applied digital pressure to the artery and took him in a motor car to the Lunawa Hospital, about four miles away. During the journey, with the assistance of the Constable, he continued to apply the digital pressure necessary to arrest the bleeding. The injured man eventually recovered."

For Meritorious Service

- Edward Bartlett, Chief Officer, Class I, Prison Service.
- Hilda Mary Braithwaite, Sorting Clerk and Telegraphist, Bridlington Post Office.
- Henry Joseph Burnett, Engineering Inspector, London Trunk Exchange, General Post Office.
- John Campbell, Second Steward, Post Office Cable Ships.
- Charles Checkley, until recently Postman, Western District Office, General Post Office.
- Philip Watson Chivers, Supervisor of Night Telephonists, London Trunk Exchange, General Post Office.
- Romeo Girard, Penitentiary Guard, St. Vincent de Paul, Quebec, Canada.
- Margaret Ross, Assistant Telephone Supervisor, Class I, Central Exchange, General Post Office, Edinburgh.
- Arthur Broadbent Shaw, Hospital Chief Officer, Class II, Prison Service.
- Harold Henry Squires, Mess Steward, Staff College, Camberley.
- Philip Albert Stephen Swan, Factory Foreman, Post Office Stores Department.
- Edwin James Woodward, Messenger and Resident Office Keeper, Southern Command, Salisbury.
- El Jak Abdulla; Sol (Warrant Officer), Sudan Police.
- Faleh Effendi Assad, Chief Customs Guard of Jaffa, Palestine.
- Adam Awad, Administrative Officer, Berber Province, Sudan.
- Laurence Bernard Boyack, Shipping Clerk, Consulate-General, Shanghai.
- Ali Bil Maati El Herizi, Head Cavass, British Consulate, Casablanca.
- Mohammed Effendi El Nail, Dispensary Doctor, Sudan. Ahuva Passy. In charge of Jewish Infant Welfare Work in Tiberias, Palestine.
- Leslie Smith, Head Drill Instructor, Police Training School, Moradabad, United Provinces, India.
- Ali bin Tuah, Chief Sub-Inspector, Federated Malay States Police.
- Perikles Haji Vassili, Mukhtar of Pedoulas, Cyprus.
- Alexandros Demetriou Zavros, Mukhtar of Kouklia, Cyprus.

=== Air Force Cross ===
- Squadron Leader Vivian Steel Parker DFC
- Flying Officer George Norman Snarey.
- Squadron Leader Douglas, Marquess of Douglas and Clydesdale MP (Auxiliary Air Force).

=== Air Force Medal ===
- Flight Sergeant (Pilot) Frederick Neal Paxman.

=== King's Police Medal (KPM) ===
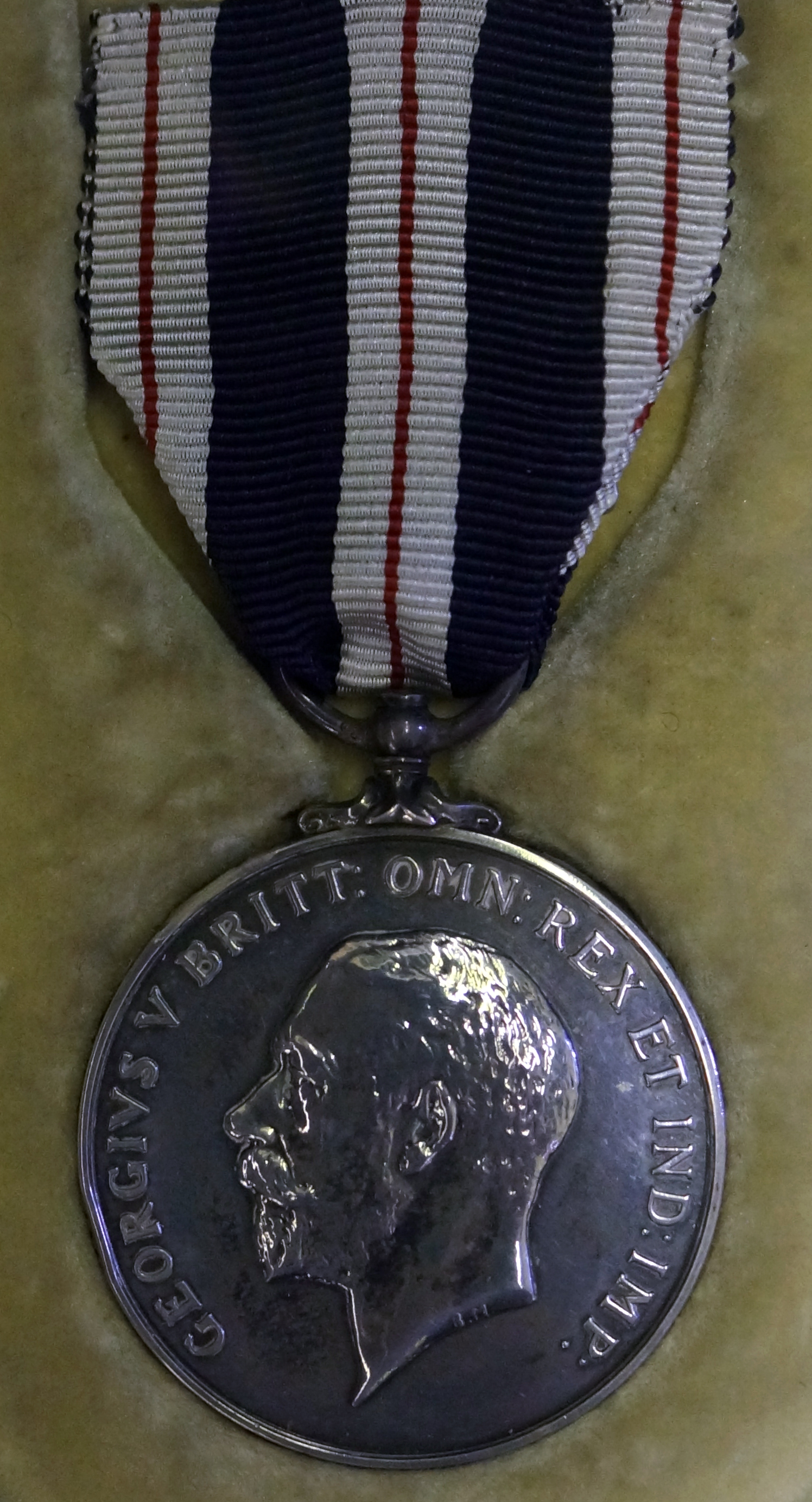
King's Police Medal with the riband for gallantry

For Gallantry
England and Wales

- Claud Douglas Smith, Inspector, Metropolitan Police Force.
- Edward Er Onan Shelah, Sergeant, Metropolitan Police Force.
- Walter Morris, Constable, Metropolitan Police Force.
- Bertram Wesley Ruddock, Constable, Metropolitan Police Force.
- Arthur George Russell, lately Constable, Metropolitan Police Force.
- Harry Timmins, Constable, Metropolitan Police Force.
- John Samuel Warren, Sergeant, Devon Constabulary.
- Joseph Evason, Constable, Shropshire Constabulary.
- Edward Halliday, Constable, Lancashire Constabulary.
- Hugh Pirnie, Constable, Hampshire Constabulary.
- Richard Robinson, Constable, Lancashire Constabulary.
- Frank Wood, Constable, Monmouthshire Constabulary.
- Charles Shorter, Sergeant, Birmingham City Police Force.
- Arthur James Skellern, Constable, Liverpool City Police Force.
- William Alfred Jabez Wait, Constable, Ramsgate Borough Police Force.

Scotland

- David Cairns, Sergeant, Glasgow City Police Force.
- Richard Gillespie, Constable, Glasgow City Police Force.
- James Hadden, lately Constable, Glasgow City Police Force.

Australia

- Leonard Henry Cooney, Constable, New South Wales Police Force.
- Cecil Clyde Newton, Constable, New South Wales Police Force.

British India

- Denys Pilditch, Superintendent, United Provinces Police. (a bar to the King's Police Medal)
- Reginald Norman Marsh-Smith, Superintendent, United Provinces Police. (a bar to the King's Police Medal)
- Bayapunedi Subbarayadu, Inspector, Madras Police.
- Ram Singhasan Singh, Head Constable, Bengal Police.
- Sanaullah, Constable, United Provinces Police.
- Mohammad Ishaq Khan, Sub-Inspector, Punjab Police.
- Ghulam Mohammad Shah, Head Constable, Punjab Police.
- Umar Din, Head Constable, Punjab Police.
- Mohammad Ibrahim, Foot Constable, Punjab Police.
- Sher Singh, Head Constable, Punjab Police.
- Rai Bahadur Ram Brik Singh, Inspector, Bihar and Orissa Police.
- Ram Kedar Singh, Sub-Inspector, Bihar and Orissa Police.
- Abdul Razak, Assistant Sub-Inspector, North-West Frontier Province Police.
- Qamar Gul, Foot Constable, North-West Frontier. Province Police.
- Sampuran Singh, Sub-Inspector, Patiala State Police.
- Muhammad Yakub, Mounted Constable, Sind Police.

For Distinguished Service
England and Wales

- Frederick William Abbott OBE MVO Chief Constable, Metropolitan Police Force.
- Lieutenant-Colonel Noel Llewellyn DSO Chief Constable of Wiltshire.
- Donald Heald, Chief Constable of the Middlesbrough Borough Police Force.
- Henry Howarth, Chief Constable of the Rochdale Borough Police Force.
- Frank Joseph May, Chief Constable of the Swansea Borough Police Force.
- Wilfred Blacker, Chief Superintendent, West Riding of Yorkshire Constabulary.
- John Crockford, Superintendent and Deputy Chief Constable, Essex Constabulary.
- John Sidney Hall, Superintendent, Leicestershire Constabulary.
- Fred Bristow, Detective Superintendent, Sheffield City Police Force.
- John Thomas May, Superintendent, Plymouth City Police Force.

Scotland

- Donald Macpherson, Assistant Chief Constable, Glasgow City Police Force.
- Colin Fraser Brown, Superintendent, Edinburgh City Police Force.

Australia

- George Alexander Mitchell, Superintendent, New South Wales Police Force.
- Matthew Linegar, Superintendent, New South Wales Police Force.
- Alexander Beattie, Superintendent, New South Wales Police Force.
- James Bennetts, Superintendent, New South Wales Police Force.
- Edward Douglas Irving, Superintendent, New South Wales Police Force.

British India

- Mukunda Lall Bhattacharji, Officiating Inspector, Bengal Police.
- Abu Ahiya Bazle Murshedi, Officiating Inspector, Bengal Police.
- Manindra Lai Das Gupta, Officiating Inspector, Bengal Police.
- Ralph Clarence Morris, Deputy Inspector-General of Police for Railways and Criminal Investigation, Burma.
- Captain Reginald Malpas Gore Assistant Commandant, Southern Shan States Battalion, Burma Military Police.
- Rai Bahadur Jasdal Limbu, Subedar-Major Eastern Battalion, Burma Military Police.

Colonies, Protectorates and Mandated Territories

- Alexander Bertfield Clarke, Sergeant of Police, British Honduras.
- Neil Stewart MM Superintendent of Police, Kenya.
- Major Frederick Thomas George Tremlett MBE Commissioner of Police and Prisons, Uganda Protectorate.
- Edward Franklin Laborde Wright, lately Deputy Inspector-General of Police, Ceylon.

=== Imperial Service Medal (ISM) ===
British India

- Valiapurayil Paidal, retired Amin, District Court, North Malabar, Madras.
- Raghubir Panday, lately Head Jemadar of Peons, Office of the Private Secretary to His Excellency the Viceroy.
- Ganga Sevak, lately Jemadar of Peons, Foreign and Political Department.

=== Royal Red Cross (RRC) ===
First Class

- Daisy Maud Martin ARRC Matron-in-Chief, Queen Alexandra's Imperial Military Nursing Service, in recognition of the exceptional devotion to duty displayed by her in military hospitals.
- Winifred Eveline Molesworth, Matron, Princess Mary's Royal Air Force Nursing Service, in recognition of the exceptional devotion and competency displayed by her in the nursing and care of the sick in Air Force Hospitals at Home and Abroad.

Second Class

- Annabella Ralph, Superintending Sister.
- Eleanor Irene Box, Nursing Sister.
- Lilla Maclachlan Ramsay, Nursing Sister.
