= Leonard Knowles =

Chief Justice of an independent Bahamas

Sir Leonard Joseph Knowles

President of the Senate of the Bahamas
- In office 1964–1972
- Prime Minister: Roland Symonette; Lynden Pindling
- Preceded by: George W. K. Roberts
- Succeeded by: Gerald Cash

Personal details
- Born: 15 March 1916 Nassau, Bahamas
- Died: 23 September 1999 (aged 83) Macon, Georgia, United States
- Children: 1
- Education: Queen's College, Nassau; King's College London

Sir Leonard Joseph Knowles, CBE (15 March 1916 – 23 September 1999) was the first Chief Justice of an independent Bahamas.

== Early life and education ==
Knowles was born in Nassau, Bahamas, and was educated at Queen's College, Nassau before going to King's College London where he took an LLB in law in 1937. In 1935, he joined Gray's Inn in London and was called to the bar in 1939. Knowles worked on Northern Circuit in Liverpool. In 1939, be married Harriet Hughes in Liverpool.

Knowles was later admitted to the Bahamas Bar and appointed Assistant Attorney-General of the Bahamas in 1948.

== Legal career ==
He was the President of the Senate of the Bahamas from 1964 to 1972. In 1973, he became the first Chief Justice in the newly independent Bahamas, a position he held until 1978. He had to be sworn in before the Bahamian Independence Day on 10 July 1973 because it was his duty to swear in the first prime minister. He was made CBE in 1963, and Knight Bachelor in the Queen's 1974 Birthday Honours.

== Later life and death ==
After his retirement, he moved to the United States to live with his son in Macon, Georgia. He died on 23 September 1999.
