= Gerald Cash =

Bahamian politician (1917–2003)

The Most Honourable Sir Gerald Cash GCMG GCVO OBE

3rd Governor-General of the Bahamas
- In office 22 January 1979 – 25 June 1988
- Monarch: Elizabeth II
- Prime Minister: Lynden Pindling
- Preceded by: Milo Butler
- Succeeded by: Henry Milton Taylor

President of the Senate of the Bahamas
- In office 1972–1973
- Prime Minister: Lynden Pindling
- Preceded by: Leonard Knowles
- Succeeded by: Doris Sands Johnson

Personal details
- Born: Gerald Christopher Cash; 28 May 1917
- Died: 6 January 2003 (aged 85)
- Spouse: Dorothy Long
- Children: 3

Sir Gerald Christopher Cash GCMG GCVO OBE (28 May 1917 – 6 January 2003) was the second governor-general of the Bahamas from 1979 to 1988.

== Life ==
Cash was born in Nassau and attended Eastern Senior High School and Government High School from which he graduated at 15. Cash was called to the Bahamas Bar in 1940 and to the English Bar at the Middle Temple in 1948.

In 1949, Cash was elected as an MP to the House of Assembly. Cash served as a member of the Executive Council from 1958 to 1962 and a Senator from 1969 to 1979. In 1964, Cash was made an Officer of the Most Excellent Order of the British Empire.

Cash served as Milo Butler's Deputy Governor General on 5 occasions from 1973 to 1976. Cash was appointed Acting Governor-General in 1976 and, in 1977, Cash was made a Knight Commander of the Royal Victorian Order (KCVO).

Cash was appointed Governor-General in 1979.

In 1980, Cash was made Knight Grand Cross of the Order of St Michael and St George (GCMG) and, in 1985, Cash was knighted Grand Cross of the Royal Victorian Order (GCVO).

Cash served as Governor-General until his retirement in 1988. Cash is the longest serving Governor General in the history of the Commonwealth of the Bahamas.

Sir Gerald Cash died in 2003 at the age of 85 from a stroke. Cash and his wife, (the former) Dorothy Long, had two sons and one daughter.

Government offices
Preceded by Sir Milo Butler	Governor-General of the Bahamas; 1979-1988	Succeeded by Sir Henry Taylor
