= Oswald Ingraham =

Bahamian politician (1937–2020)

James Oswald Ingraham

Speaker of the House of Assembly of the Bahamas
- In office 22 May 2002 – 23 May 2007
- Prime Minister: Perry Christie
- Preceded by: Rome Italia Johnson
- Succeeded by: Alvin Smith

Personal details
- Born: 24 June 1937
- Died: 23 November 2020 (aged 83)
- Party: Progressive Liberal Party

James Oswald Ingraham was a Bahamian businessman and politician and former Speaker of the House of Assembly.

Ingraham was born 24 June 1937 in Tarpum Bay, Eleuthera. He became the first black employee in Barclays Bank in Eleuthera. Later he became a businessman in tourism and hospitality industry.

In 2002, Ingraham was elected to the House of Assembly, and represented Central and South Eleuthera constituency for the Progressive Liberal Party. He was also a cabinet minister and deputy governor-general. He was elected as Speaker of the House of Assembly on 23 May 2002. He served as the speaker until the 2007 elections.

He died on 23 November 2020 at Princess Margaret Hospital at the age of 83.
