= Doris Sands Johnson =

Bahamian politician (1921–1983)

Dame Doris Sands Johnson DBE
- Johnson in 1960

Bahamian Senator
- In office 1967 – 21 June 1983
- Monarch: Elizabeth II
- Prime Minister: Lynden Pindling

President of the Senate of the Bahamas
- In office 1973–1982
- Prime Minister: Lynden Pindling
- Preceded by: Gerald Cash
- Succeeded by: Edwin Coleby

Minister of Transport
- In office 1968–1973

Personal details
- Born: Doris Louise Sands; 19 June 1921 St. Agnes, New Providence, Bahamas
- Died: 21 June 1983 (aged 62)
- Party: PLP
- Spouse: Ratal Allen Johnson (m. 1943)
- Education: Virginia Union University; McGill University; University of Toronto; New York University
- Occupation: Teacher, suffragist, author
- Known for: First woman appointed to, and to serve as president of, the Bahamian Senate

Dame Doris Sands Johnson DBE (19 June 1921 – 21 June 1983) was a Bahamian teacher, suffragette, and politician. She was the first Bahamian woman to contest an election in the Bahamas, the first female Senate appointee, and the first woman granted a leadership role in the Senate. Once in the legislature, she was the first woman to be made a government minister and then was elected as the first woman President of the Senate. She was honored as Dame Commander of the Most Excellent Order of the British Empire by Queen Elizabeth II.

Born on New Providence Island, she completed her secondary education and became a teacher. After teaching for 17 years, Johnson returned to school to earn a master's and doctorate degree in educational administration. During this period, she traveled back and forth between school and her Bahamian home organizing labor and suffrage efforts. Upon graduation, Johnson was unable to find work because of her activism. She made a compelling speech to the Bahamian legislature in 1959, pleading for women's suffrage and subsequently made a similar plea to the Colonial Office in London. Once the right to vote had been secured, Johnson immediately entered politics in 1961, running in the first election in which women were allowed to participate. Though she lost her bid, she worked with the Progressive Liberal Party to gain Bahamian independence. When the country gained its freedom from colonial rule, Johnson was appointed to the Senate and served the government until her death, a decade later.

== Background and education ==
Doris Louise Sands was born on 19 June 1921 in St. Agnes, New Providence, The Bahamas, to Sarah Elizabeth (née Fyne) and John Albert Sands. After completing her secondary education, Sands began teaching at the age of 15. On 3 January 1943 at Zion Baptist Church in Nassau, Sands married Ratal Allen Johnson. They subsequently had one son and Johnson worked for 17 years to earn the money to further her education. Around 1953, she was able to enroll at Virginia Union University in Richmond, Virginia, graduating with a bachelor's degree in education. She returned to the Bahamas in 1956 and joined the Progressive Liberal Party (PLP). Granted a four-year government scholarship to further her education in Canada, Johnson enrolled in a master's degree program in educational administration. Beginning her studies at MacDonald College of Education of McGill University, she earned her master's degree and began work on her doctorate at the Ontario College of Education at the University of Toronto. In the midst of her studies, the government terminated the scholarship during her third year of studying abroad, under the guise that her master's degree had been completed. Johnson believed that the scholarship was terminated because she had been active in organizing. She helped found the Women’s Suffrage Movement in the Bahamas, and in 1958 both the Bahamian Federation of Labour and the National Council of Women, traveling home intermittently during her studies to work towards enfranchisement. She returned home, but was advised that the only available positions for teaching administrators were in outlying islands.

== Political rise ==
"We women press this demand and ask such enactment on the basis of not who is right, but what is right for our country. We judge expediency only on this basis. We seek no compromise. There is no alternative. We abhor any delaying action. We women ask only that you gentlemen move now to secure the rights of fifty-four thousand women, including your wives and daughters".

— Doris Johnson, 1959 speech to the Members of the House of Assembly, Nassau, Bahamas.

Feeling that her employment opportunities were being blocked, that same year, on 19 January 1959, Johnson asked to address the members of the Bahamian House of the Assembly, but was told she could only speak after the session adjourned, to which she agreed. In her speech, she pointed out that a petition had been submitted to the House in 1958 for suffrage, which Members had claimed showed only 13 petitioners and 529 signatories. She provided mimeographed copies showing the actual number was 2,829 people and included people from Abaco, Andros, Cat Island, Eleuthera, Exuma, Grand Bahama, Long Island, and New Providence. She went on to complain that women were being taxed without representation and reasoned that should the vote not be extended to them, they should no longer have to pay taxes. She insisted that women were working members of society and were ready, willing, and able to participate as full citizens. Though the Members of Parliament were impressed with the speech, they did nothing.

In 1960, Johnson, as leader of the Women's Suffrage Movement, and Eugenia Lockhart, the organization's secretary, went to London to plead the case for suffrage. They met with the London branch of the International Alliance of Women to discuss the situation in the Bahamas, claiming that though they had the support of the majority of Bahamian women, many women could not voice their approval because they were employed by merchants and the government who were opposed to the cause. They also sought an audience at the Colonial Office to air their grievances, accompanied by the chairman of the PLP, Henry Milton Taylor. They met with the Secretary of State for the Colonies, Iain Macleod, and two women British Parliamentarians, Baroness Joan Vickers and Baroness Eirene White. The Bahamians were assured that their case was accepted and that change would soon follow. They returned, but no change was forthcoming.

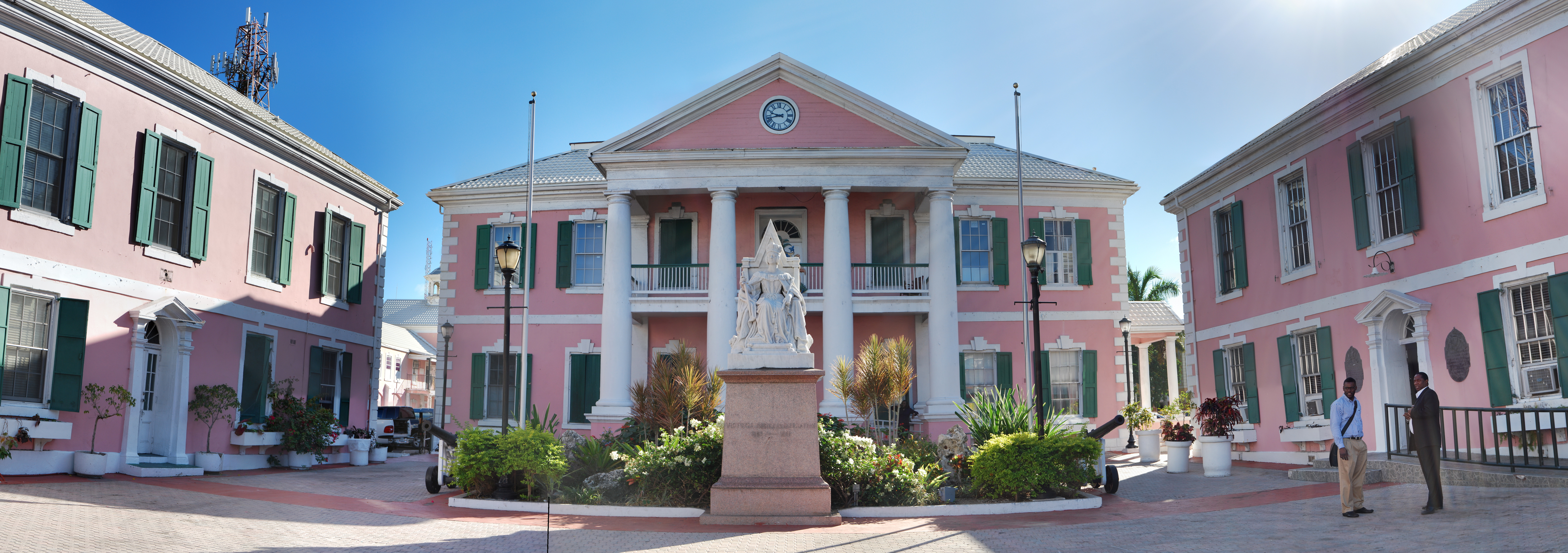
Bahamian Parliament Building

Supporters rallied and collected funds for Johnson to complete her education in the United States, and she enrolled at New York University, completing her Doctor of Education in 1962. When suffrage passed in 1961, Johnson immediately entered the fray, accepting a nomination as a PLP candidate for the Eleuthera District. She wrote a booklet entitled The Next Step: Votes for Women in which she explained useful information for voting, such as how to register to vote and cast a ballot. She lost the race, but three years later participated in a debate in the push for majority rule on the parliamentary imbalance in the Bahamas with a delegation from the PLP at the United Nations. At that meeting, she met the president of her alma mater from Virginia Union, and agreed to accept a teaching post at Southern University in Baton Rouge, Louisiana. A little over a year later, Johnson left Louisiana and came back to the Bahamas to participate in the 1967 elections. The PLP won the majority of seats and she became the first woman appointee to serve in the Bahamian Senate. One of her first acts was to form a committee to help the Haitian diaspora who had fled to the Bahamas because of unrest in their own country. With an estimated 20,000 to 30,000 refugees and a government decree to stop issuing work permits to Haitians, the situation was critical. The following year, PLP had a landslide victory in the 1968 election and Johnson was reappointed to the Senate, and appointed as the first woman to lead government business.

From 1968 to 1973, Johnson was the Transportation Minister and her appointment was the first time a woman had served in the Bahamian Cabinet. In 1972, Johnson published a book entitled The Quiet Revolution in the Bahamas, which discussed the struggle for racial parity and independence, likening the efforts in the Bahamas to the American Civil Rights Movement and Martin Luther King Jr.'s fight. The book has been called "one of the most important accounts of the events and personalities involved in the attainment of Majority Rule and Independence in The Bahamas". The following year, when the Bahama's gained independence from Britain, Johnson resigned from her post as Minister and was elected as the first female President of the Senate. In 1977, shortly after being reelected to the presidency, Johnson received Queen Elizabeth II. In 1979, she was honored as Dame Commander of the Most Excellent Order of the British Empire.

Besides her official roles, Johnson served as a founding member of the Bahamas Folklore Group and spoke at various women's groups in the Bahamas and United States. She also served as president of the National Women's Housing Association and coordinator of the Bahamas Baptist Missionary and Educational Convention's Women's Auxiliary.

Johnson died aged 62 on 21 June 1983. Posthumously, a high school that bears her name was dedicated in 2002 in Nassau, and officially opened in 2011.

== Selected works ==
- Johnson, Doris L. (19 January 1959). Call for Equal Rights for All Bahamian Women (Speech). Meeting of the Members of the House of Assembly. Government House, Nassau, Bahamas. Contained in Fawkes 2003, pp. 204–210.
- Johnson, Doris L. (1962). A guide for the establishment of an advisory council to the Bahamas Board of Education: based upon a study of advisory services to the Central British Educational Authority from 1899 to 1959 (Ed. D.). New York University.
- Johnson, Doris L. (1962). The Next Step: Votes for Women. Nassau, Bahamas.
- Johnson, Doris L. The Man on the Black Horse. Nassau, Bahamas.
- Johnson, Doris L. (1972). The Quiet Revolution in the Bahamas. Nassau, Bahamas: Family Islands Press.
- Johnson, Doris L. (1973). Age of Awareness. Nassau, Bahamas.
- Johnson, Doris L. (1989). "Political Change". In Collinwood, Dean W.; Dodge, Steve (eds.). Modern Bahamian Society. Parkersburg, IA, USA: Caribbean Books. pp. 33–38. ISBN 0931209013.

== Sources ==
- Baldwin, Lewis V; Dekar, Paul R (2013). "In an Inescapable Network of Mutuality": Martin Luther King, Jr. and the Globalization of an Ethical Ideal. Eugene, Oregon: Wipf and Stock Publishers. ISBN 978-1-62189-825-2.
- Fawkes, Sir Randol F. (2003). Fawkes, Rosalie J.; Fawkes, Francis; Fawkes, David (eds.). The Faith That Moved the Mountain: A Memoir of a Life and the Times (PDF) (Memorial ed.). Nassau, Bahamas: Dodd Printers. pp. 204–210. Archived from the original (PDF) on 17 October 2016.
- Hanna-Ewers, Deanne (January 2013). Great Women in Bahamian History: Bahamian Women Pioneers. Bloomington, Indiana: AuthorHouse. ISBN 978-1-4520-5398-1.
- Outten-Stubbs, Kim (1962). Aspects of Bahamian History: A Chronological History of Women's Suffrage in The Bahamas 1952–1962 (PDF) (Report). Nassau, Bahamas: Department of Archives, Ministry of Education.
