= Kendal Major =

Bahamian politician and dentist

Kendal Versil Olson Major

Speaker of the House of Assembly of the Bahamas
- In office 23 May 2012 – 24 May 2017
- Prime Minister: Perry Christie
- Preceded by: Alvin Smith
- Succeeded by: Halson Moultrie

Personal details
- Born: 1960-1962
- Party: Progressive Liberal Party

Kendal V. O. Major is a Bahamian politician and dentist and former Speaker of the House of Assembly.

== Early life and education ==
Kendal Versil Olson Major was 16 years old in 1977, so he was born about 1960–1962. He graduated from St John's College in 1977. He graduated from Tuskegee University in 1981. He graduated in 1987 from Howard University with a doctor of dental surgery degree. In 1989, he became the first graduated periodontist in the Bahamas.

== Career ==
He has a dental practice in Nassau. He worked in public health at Princess Margaret Hospital as director for dental services from 1989 to 1993, and as the chairman of the Bahamas Dental Council from 2002 to 2007.

Major is a member of Progressive Liberal Party. He served as the vice chairman of the party from 2008 to 2010.

Major was elected as a member of House of Assembly of the Bahamas in 2012 from Garden Hills constituency. He was elected Speaker of the House on 23 May 2012. He was the youngest speaker of the House of Assembly. He served as the speaker and as an MP until 2017.
