= Alvin Smith (Bahamian politician) =

Bahamian politician

The Honourable Alvin Smith
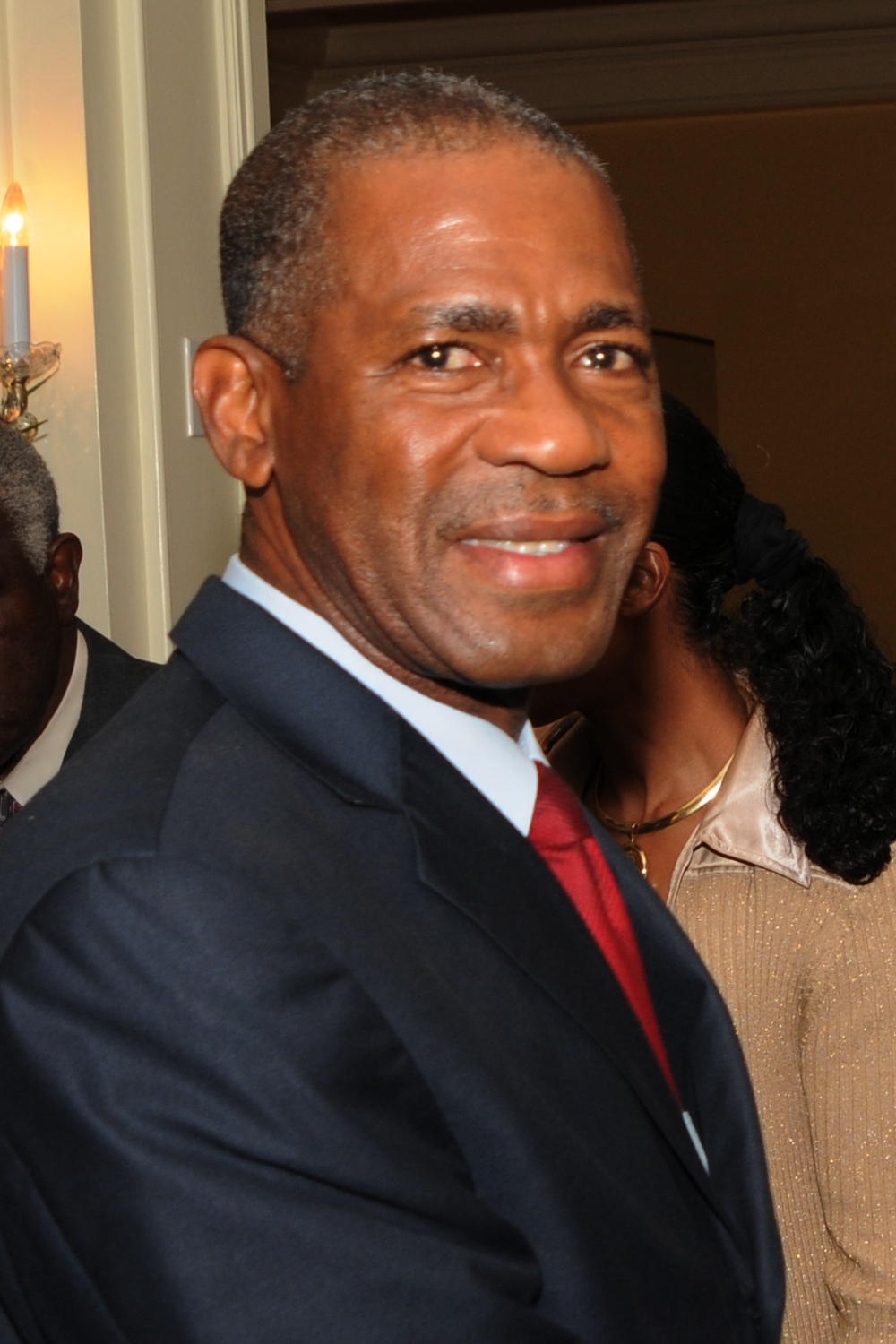
- Smith in 2008

Speaker of the House of Assembly of the Bahamas
- In office May 2007 – May 2012
- Prime Minister: Hubert Ingraham
- Preceded by: Oswald Ingraham
- Succeeded by: Kendal Major

Leader of the Opposition
- In office 2002–2005
- Preceded by: Perry Christie
- Succeeded by: Hubert Ingraham

Member of the House of Assembly of the Bahamas
- In office 1997–2012
- Constituency: North Eleuthera

Personal details
- Born: 23 September 1951 (age 74) Hatchet Bay, Eleuthera, Bahamas
- Party: Free National Movement

Alvin Smith (born 23 September 1951) is a Bahamian politician who was the Speaker of the House of Assembly from 2007 to 2012. He was the MP for the Constituency of North Eleuthera from 1997 to 2012.

== Biography ==
Smith was born in Hatchet Bay, a town on the island of Eleuthera. He obtained a Bachelor's degree in Education from the University of Miami, and subsequently spent 24 years as a teacher and a trustee of the Bahamas Union of Teachers. He entered politics in 1992 as a member of the Free National Movement, where he was engaged in several appointments which included Parliamentary Secretary in the Ministry of Education in 1995, and again in 2001. In 1997 he was elected to the House of Assembly as MP for the constituency of North Eleuthera. In May 2002 Smith was re-elected as Member of Parliament for North Eleuthera and from May 2002 to November 2005 served as leader of the Free National Movement in Parliament and leader of the opposition. Following the national elections in May 2007, Smith was appointed as Speaker of the House of Assembly by the new FNM led Government. He served as Speaker until 2012.

From 2017 to 2020, Smith was the Bahamas High Commissioner to Canada.
