= Harcourt Gladstone Malcolm =

Bahamian lawyer and politician (1875–1936)

Harcourt Gladstone Malcolm CBE, KC (7 February 1875 – 26 December 1936) was a Bahamian lawyer, politician and historian. He was a Member of Parliament, Speaker of the House of Assembly from 1914 to 1936. In January 1936, he was made a Commander of the British Empire (CBE) in the King's New Years Honours.

== Personal life ==
Malcolm was born in Nassau, Bahamas in February 1875, the son of Ormond Drimmie Malcolm and his wife, the former Ann Frances Sands. Malcolm's father Ormond had been Chief Justice and the Speaker of the House of Assembly from 1868 to 1897. In 1907, Malcolm married Kathleen Adderley.

== Career ==
Malcolm read law for three years in London before being called to the bar at Lincoln's Inn in 1899 and the Bahamas Bar later the same year. Malcolm was made King's Counsel in 1910.

Malcolm was elected to the House of Assembly in 1901. He was elected Speaker of the House of Assembly in February 1914 following the death of the previous speaker. Malcolm served as Speaker from 1914 until his death. Malcolm was made a Commander of the British Empire (CBE) in the King's New Years Honours of 1936.

Malcolm died on 27 December 1936 at his home in Nassau from influenza and cerebral haemorrhage. In his will, Malcolm left his collection of books and papers to the Nassau Library and bequeath money for a scholarship fund.

== Works ==
- Malcolm, Harcourt G. (1910) Historical Documents relating to the Bahama Islands, Nassau.
- Malcolm, Harcourt G. (1913) Historical Memorandum (Pamphlet), Published by the Nassau Guardian.
- Malcolm, Harcourt G. (1921) History of the Bahamas House of Assembly. Reprint 1956
- Malcolm, Harcourt G., ed. (1929) Statute Law of the Bahamas 1799-1929. 2 vols. Nassau: Government of the Colony of the Bahama Islands. Printed by Waterlow and Sons, London.
- Malcolm, Harcourt G., ed. (1934) Manual of Procedure in the Business of the General Assembly. Nassau: House of Assembly.
- Malcolm, Harcourt G., Historic Forts of the Bahamas (Booklet)
