= George Campbell Anderson =

Chief Justice of the Bahamas

Sir George Campbell Anderson (22 January 1805 – 1 March 1884) was Chief Justice of the Bahamas from 1875, acting Chief Justice of Ceylon, and Chief Justice of the Leeward Islands from 1877.

He was speaker of the Bahamas House of Assembly from 1831 to 1868.

He died on 1 March 1884 at Kingston, Jamaica, aged 79.

== Selected publications ==
- Statute Laws of the Bahamas. London, 1862. (8 parts)
