= Patricia Deveaux =

Bahamian politician

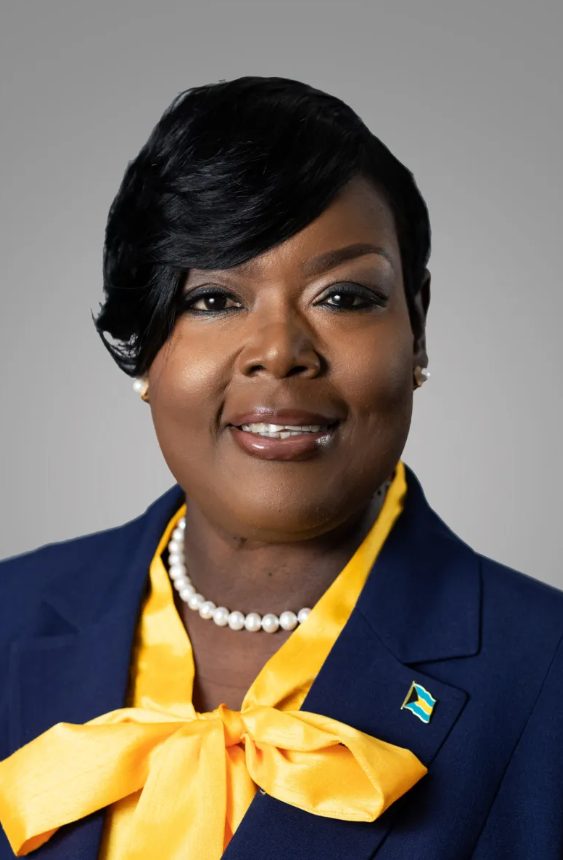
- Official portrait, 2022

55th Speaker of the House of Assembly of the Bahamas
- Incumbent
- Assumed office 7 October 2021
- Prime Minister: Philip Davis
- Deputy: Sylvannus Petty
- Preceded by: Halson Moultrie

Member of Parliament for Bamboo Town
- Incumbent
- Assumed office 23 September 2021
- Preceded by: Renward Wells

Personal details
- Born: 1968 (age 57–58)
- Party: Progressive Liberal Party
- Children: 1

Patricia Ann Deveaux (born 1968) is a Bahamian Progressive Liberal Party politician serving as Speaker of the House of Assembly and the Member of Parliament (MP) for Bamboo Town. She is the second woman to hold the position of Speaker after Italia Johnson.

== Career ==
Deveaux served as a Senior Executive Secretary in the Ministry of National Security for 30 years. She also served as National Vice-Chairman of the Progressive Liberal Party, PLP Chairman of the Kennedy constituency and PLP Chairman of Bamboo Town constituency.

=== Parliament ===
Patricia Deveaux was elected to parliament in 2021 from the Bamboo Town constituency defeating incumbent Free National Movement incumbent Renward Wells. She, along with 6 others, make up the largest number of women to ever be seated as members of parliament in the Bahamas. Deveaux was elected the second woman Speaker of the House of Assembly.

In 2024 Shanendon Cartwright, the deputy leader of the opposition, seized the Parliamentary Mace and threw it out of the window. This was a repeat of a similar protest made in the Bahamas in 1965. Seizing the Mace as a protest is a known form of Parliamentary protests in many Commonwealth countries. Deveaux said afterwards that this protest caused her to be "in fear for her life" and, in the immediate aftermath, she allowed armed officers (with firearms) to enter the chamber to restore order, even shouting "get him". This is a severe taboo within Commonwealth jurisdictions, since 1642 when King Charles entered the house of commons accompanied by soldiers, looking to arrest five MPs accused of treason).

In the 2026 Bahamian general election, she was re-elected to the House of Assembly.
