= List of speakers of the House of Assembly of the Bahamas =

The first Speaker of the House of Assembly of the Bahamas was done in the year 1729 following the establishment of the General Assembly, started by Woodes Roger. The first Speaker was John Colebrooke.

== List of speakers ==
| Name | Took office | Left office |
|---|---|---|
| John Colebrooke | 29 September 1729 | 21 August 1734 |
| James Scott | 21 August 1734 | 1743 |
| Florentius Cox | 1743 | 23 February 1749 |
| John Mackintosh | 23 February 1749 | 9 November 1750 |
| James Stowe | 9 November 1750 | 9 January 1753 |
| Samuel Green | 9 January 1753 | 27 August 1753 |
| Charles Marshall | 27 August 1753 | 1760 |
| Esward Stiles | 1760 | 11 February 1760 |
| Daniel Larouch | 11 February 1760 | 18 March 1762 |
| James Gould | 18 March 1762 | 8 July 1766 |
| Ebenezer Love | 8 July 1766 | 1 December 1766 |
| Robert Sterling | 1 December 1766 | 10 November 1768 |
| George Fraser | 10 November 1768 | 13 December 1768 |
| Robert Sterling | 13 December 1768 | 7 April 1772 |
| Nicholas Garner | 7 April 1772 | 17 December 1776 |
| Parr Ross | 17 December 1776 | 12 February 1782 |
| Nicholas Garner | 12 February 1782 | 20 April 1784 |
| John Boyd | 20 April 1784 | 1 February 1785 |
| Thomas Roker | 1 February 1785 | 19 September 1794 |
| John Kelsall | 19 September 1794 | 6 October 1795 |
| Thomas Roker | 6 October 1795 | 7 November 1797 |
| Archibald Campbell | 7 November 1797 | 30 October 1798 |
| Alexander Campbell Wylly | 30 October 1798 | 17 November 1800 |
| James Webster | 17 November 1800 | 6 October 1801 |
| Alexander Campbell Wylly | 6 October 1801 | 16 March 1802 |
| James Webster | 16 March 1802 | 22 October 1811 |
| William Kerr | 22 October 1811 | 3 November 1812 |
| Alexander Young | 3 November 1812 | 3 November 1813 |
| James Webster | 3 November 1813 | 5 November 1816 |
| Lewis Kerr | 5 November 1816 | 10 December 1828 |
| Thomas Browne Wylly | 10 December 1828 | 31 May 1831 |
| George Campbell Anderson | 31 May 1831 | 6 June 1838 |
| John Gray Meadows | 6 June 1838 | 6 June 1839 |
| George Campbell Anderson | 6 June 1839 | 6 November 1866 |
| Bruce Burnside | 6 November 1866 | 14 February 1867 |
| George Campbell Anderson | 14 February 1867 | 24 June 1868 |
| Ormond Drimmie Malcolm | 24 June 1868 | 15 December 1897 |
| Robert Henry Sawyer | 15 December 1897 | 30 May 1898 |
| Francis Abraham Holmes | 30 May 1898 | 17 December 1913 |
| Harcourt Gladstone Malcolm | 2 February 1914 | 26 December 1936 |
| William Christopher Barnett Johnson | 29 December 1936 | 1 September 1942 |
| Audrey Kenneth Solomon | 1 September 1942 | 4 November 1946 |
| Asa Hubert Pritchard | 4 November 1946 | 6 December 1962 |
| Robert Symonette | 6 December 1962 | 9 February 1967 |
| Alvin Rudolph Braynen | 9 February 1967 | 18 October 1972 |
| Arlington Butler | 18 October 1972 | 20 October 1977 |
| Clifford Darling | 20 October 1977 | 14 November 1991 |
| Milo Butler Jr. | 14 November 1991 | 2 September 1992 |
| Vernon Symonette | 2 September 1992 | 9 April 1997 |
| Rome Italia Johnson | 9 April 1997 | 22 May 2002 |
| Oswald Ingraham | 22 May 2002 | 23 May 2007 |
| Alvin Smith | 23 May 2007 | 23 May 2012 |
| Kendal Major | 23 May 2012 | 24 May 2017 |
| Halson Moultrie | 24 May 2017 | September 2021 |
| Patricia Deveaux | 6 October 2021 | Incumbent |
