= Katherine Forbes-Smith =

Bahamian politician

President of the Senate of the Bahamas
- In office May 2017 – December 2019
- Prime Minister: Hubert Minnis
- Preceded by: Sharon R. Wilson
- Succeeded by: Mildred Hall-Watson

Personal details
- Party: Free National Movement

Katherine Forbes-Smith is a Bahamian lawyer and politician and former President of the Senate of the Bahamas.

She is a member of Free National Movement. She was first time appointed as member of the Senate of the Bahamas in 2001 and 2007. In 2007 she was appointed as parliamentary secretary in the office of prime minister Hubert Ingraham. Then she was appointed as the first consul general of the Bahamas to Atlanta, USA, until 2017.

Forbes-Smith was appointed as the President of the Senate of the Bahamas in May 2017. She resigned in November 2019 to lead disaster management agency (Disaster Reconstruction Authority) in the aftermath of Hurricane Dorian. Her contract as the leader of the agency was cancelled in 2021 following PLP victory in the 2021 elections.
