= Rome Italia Johnson =

Bahamian politician (born 1954)

Speaker of the House of Assembly of the Bahamas
- In office 9 April 1997 – 22 May 2002
- Prime Minister: Hubert Ingraham
- Preceded by: Vernon Symonette
- Succeeded by: Oswald Ingraham

Personal details
- Born: 1 August 1954 (age 71)
- Party: Free National Movement

Rome Italia Johnson is a Bahamian former insurance executive who served as the Speaker of the Bahamas House of Assembly from April 1997 until May 2002. Also called Speaker, not President, she was the first female to serve in that position.

She was born 1 August 1954 in Nassau. She went to University of Miami and Georgetown University in Washington. From 1977 until 1992 she worked in the insurance industry and she was the first female President of the Life Underwriters Association of the Bahamas. She is a member of Free National Movement.
