= Mildred Hall-Watson =

Bahamian politician

President of the Senate of the Bahamas
- In office December 2019 – October 2021
- Prime Minister: Hubert Minnis
- Preceded by: Katherine Forbes-Smith
- Succeeded by: Lashell Adderley

Personal details
- Party: Free National Movement

Mildred Hall-Watson is a Bahamian obstetrician/gynaecologist and politician who was President of the Senate from December 2019 until October 2021.

Hall-Watson graduated from the Howard University College of Medicine in Washington, D.C. in 1977.

Hall-Watson is an Obstetrician/Gynecologist. She is a Fellow of the American College of Surgeons, a member of the International College of Surgeons, and a Fellow of the American College of Obstetricians and Gynecologists. She was the Medical Director of Health Care Centre for Women and New Beginnings Birthing and Surgical Centre in the Bahamas. She was the Director of the Bahamas PACE Foundation (Providing Access to Continued Education).

Hall-Watson is a member of the Free National Movement. She became Vice-President of the Senate in May 2017. On 5 December 2019, she was unanimously elected as President of the Senate after being nominated by Attorney General Carl Bethel. In May 2020, it was reported that she was Prime Minister Hubert Minnis' first choice to become Minister of Health, however this would have required another Minister resigning as under the country's Constitution only two members of the Cabinet can be from the Senate.

Hall-Watson was made a Member of the Order of the British Empire in the 2020 New Year Honours for "services to Medicine and to Civic Involvement."
