= Lynn Holowesko =

Bahamian lawyer and politician

President of the Senate of the Bahamas
- In office 2007–2012
- Prime Minister: Hubert Ingraham
- Preceded by: Sharon R. Wilson
- Succeeded by: Sharon R. Wilson

Personal details
- Born: 11 October 1935 (age 90)
- Party: Free National Movement

Lynn Holowesko is a Bahamian lawyer and politician and former President of the Senate of the Bahamas.

She was born 11 October 1935. She studied in The Catholic University of America, USA. She is attorney-at-law and works in private practise.

She is a member of Free National Movement. She was appointed to the Senate of the Bahamas in 2000. She was appointed President of the Senate of the Bahamas from 2007 to 2012.

She is married to William Paul Holowesko.
