= Halson Moultrie =

Bahamian politician (born 1952)

Dewitt Halson Moultrie

Speaker of the House of Assembly of the Bahamas
- In office 24 May 2017 – 7 October 2021
- Prime Minister: Hubert Minnis
- Preceded by: Kendal Major
- Succeeded by: Patricia Deveaux

Personal details
- Born: 1952 (age 73–74)
- Party: Free National Movement

Dewitt Halson Moultrie is a Bahamian politician and former Speaker of the House of Assembly.

Moultrie was born in 1952. He is a lawyer by profession. He was a political activist, and a Progressive Liberal Party candidate to the House of Assembly. He worked as a meteorologist for 20 years.

Moultrie was elected as a member of the House of Assembly of the Bahamas from Nassau Village constituency. He was elected as the Speaker of the House of Assembly on 24 May 2017 under Free National Movement mandate.

Moultrie joined Free National Movement in 2015. He was a member of the party until 2021 when he resigned. He did not resign as the Speaker of the House of Assembly. He ran in the 2021 elections as an independent candidate but was not elected.
