= Samuel Joyce Thomas =

British barrister, colonial judge and politician (1875-1952)

Sir Samuel Joyce Thomas
- Born: 26 September 1875
- Died: 19 January 1952 (aged 77)
- Occupations: Barrister and colonial judge
- Years active: 1898–1937

Sir Samuel Joyce Thomas (26 September 1875 – 19 January 1952) was a British barrister, colonial judge and politician who served as the Chief Justice of the Federated Malay States between 1933 and 1937.

== Early life and education ==
Son of Edmund Thomas, barrister, Samuel Joyce Thomas was born on 26 September 1875. He was educated at King's College, London and after gaining several academic distinctions was called to the Bar, Middle Temple in 1898.

== Career ==
From 1906 to 1916, Thomas was Chairman of Tatsfield Parish Council. In 1910, he contested Stoke-on-Trent as a Unionist candidate. From 1915 to 1919, he was a member of London County Council. He practised as a barrister on the Oxford circuit. His career was interrupted in 1915 when he enlisted, and later commissioned, in the Royal Garrison Artillery of the Army Service Corps. He served in the First World War in France, Flanders and Italy before he was invalided out in 1919.

In 1919, he was appointed Chief Justice of St. Vincent. In 1923, he was appointed Second Puisne Judge of Trinidad and Tobago, and in 1929, was a Puisne Judge in Kenya. In 1933, he was appointed Chief Justice of the Federated Malay States and remained in office until his retirement in 1937.

Thomas died in Trinidad on 19 January 1952.

== Honours ==
In 1935, Thomas received a knighthood in the New Year's Honours list.
