= Bahamian Parliament Building =

Building constructed in 1815 in Nassau, Bahamas

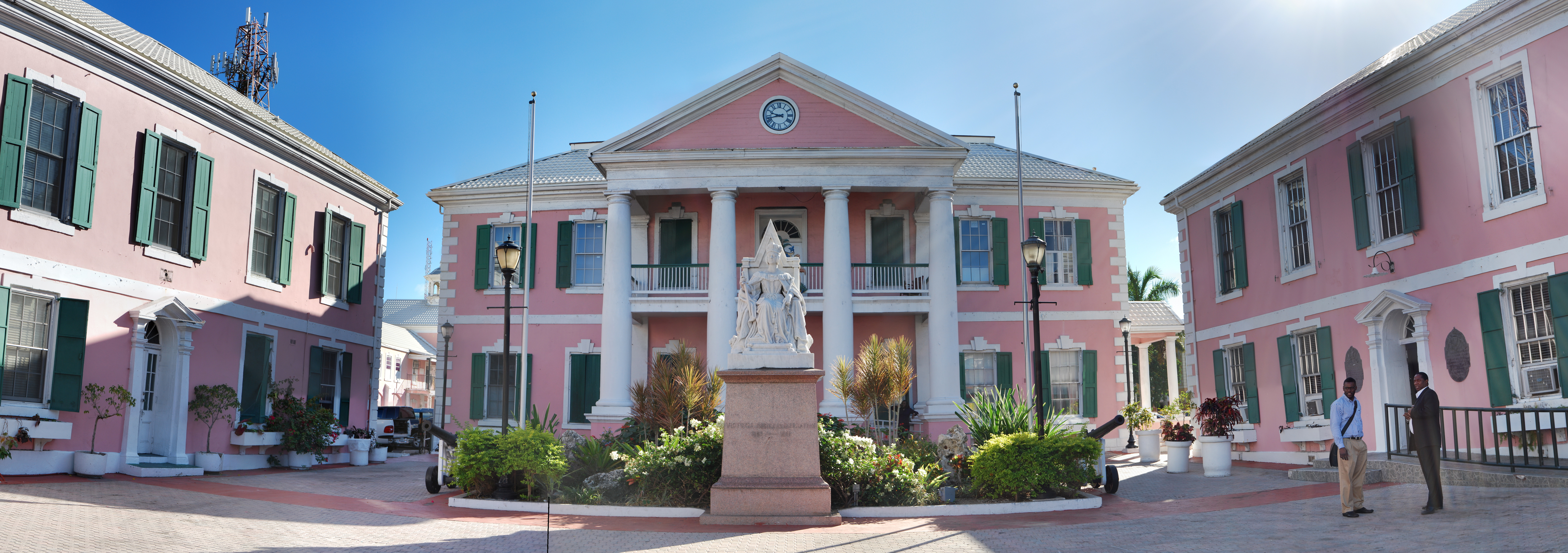
- The Parliament of the Bahamas, located in downtown Nassau

- Location within Bahamas

General information
- Architectural style: British colonial; American Federal
- Location: Parliament Square, Bay Street, Nassau, Bahamas
- Coordinates: 25°04′39″N 77°20′26″W
- Completed: 1815; 211 years ago

The Bahamian Parliament Building is the home of the House of Assembly of the Parliament of the Bahamas, located in Parliament Square, Bay Street, in the Bahaman capital of Nassau. The coral pink-colored building was constructed in 1815 by Loyalist refugees from the newly-independent United States, in the British colonial style, often compared to the American Federal style.

A statue of Queen Victoria stands in Parliament Square.

The house of parliament in the beginning of the 20th century (by O. Pierre Havens)
