= 1729 Bahamian general election =

General elections were held in the Bahamas in September 1729, the first elections in the territory.

== Background ==
In August 1729, new Governor Woodes Rogers was instructed by King George II to create a 24-member General Assembly for the Bahamas. Rogers issued a proclamation on 8 September, ordering eligible voters to meet at polling places during the next two weeks. The reforms had been planned by the previous Governor George Phenney and authorised in July 1728.

== Electoral system ==
The General Assembly had 24 members elected from five constituencies; eight representatives were elected in Nassau, whilst Eastern District, Western District, Eleuthera and Harbour Island all had four representatives. Voting was restricted to around 250 white men aged over 21, and the elections took place between 12 and 20 September. In Nassau the elections were held at the house of Samuel Lawford, in the Eastern District they took place at Samuel Frith's house, and in Western District they took place at the house of John Watkins.

== Results ==
Constituency	Date of election	Elected members
Eastern District	18 September	John Bennet
Eastern District	18 September	Thomas Downham
Eastern District	18 September	Samuel Frith
Eastern District	18 September	Thomas Saunders
Eleuthera	20 September	John Bethall
Eleuthera	20 September	John Carey
Eleuthera	20 September	Joseph Ingham
Eleuthera	20 September	Paul Newbould
Harbour Island	20 September	Seaborn Pinder
Harbour Island	20 September	John Roberts
Harbour Island	20 September	John Thompson Jr
Harbour Island	20 September	John Thompson Sr
Nassau	12 September	John Colebrooke
Nassau	12 September	Edward Elding
Nassau	12 September	Peter Goudet
Nassau	12 September	Benjamin Hall
Nassau	12 September	Samuel Lawford
Nassau	12 September	William Pinder
Nassau	12 September	Roger Reading
Nassau	12 September	Moses Sims Sr
Western District	20 September	Jacob Jarrold
Western District	20 September	Claude Belon
Western District	20 September	Flar Cox
Western District	20 September	Thomas Lory
Source: Hart

== Aftermath ==
The General Assembly met for the first time on 29 September at the house of Samuel Lawford. John Colebrooke was elected as its first speaker. It was dissolved on 7 December 1730 by the Governor after it voted against continuing to pay his £200 salary and also voted out the Speaker, who was sympathetic to the Governor.
