= Sharon R. Wilson =

Bahamian politician (born 1948)

President of the Senate of the Bahamas
- In office May 2012 – May 2017
- Prime Minister: Perry Christie
- Preceded by: Lynn Holowesko
- Succeeded by: Katherine Forbes-Smith
- In office May 2002 – May 2007
- Prime Minister: Perry Christie
- Preceded by: John Henry Bostwick
- Succeeded by: Lynn Holowesko

Personal details
- Born: 25 September 1948 (age 77)
- Party: Progressive Liberal Party
- Spouse: Franklyn Wilson

Sharon R. (Lady) Wilson (born 25 September 1948) is the second female President of the Senate of the Commonwealth of the Bahamas. She is the only person, male or female, to have served two non-consecutive terms in that office.

She was born in Nassau, Bahamas, and attended public schools there until 1961. She then attended St. John's College, graduating in 1966.

Wilson attended Florida Memorial University where she received her BA, with honors, in 1971. She earned her M.SC. in 1979 from the University of Miami. She was a chief magistrate for the Commonwealth, and was the President of the Senate from May 2002 until May 2007, and then again from May 2012 until May 2017.
