= Charles William Lindsay =

Canadian businessman and philanthropist

Sir Charles William Lindsay, KBE (6 April 1856 – 7 November 1939) was a Canadian businessman and philanthropist, particularly for the blind.

Born and educated in Montreal, Lindsay lost his sight aged 19, and trained as a piano tuner. He subsequently founded the piano and music retailer C.W. Lindsay & Co., which he ran until it became a public company in 1928. The patron of numerous charities, he was created a KBE in 1935 "For philanthropic and charitable services in the Dominion of Canada".
