= List of presidents of the Senate of the Bahamas =

This is a list of presidents of the Senate of the Bahamas. The president is the presiding officer of the Senate of the Bahamas. Below is a list of office-holders:

Name	Entered office	Left office
Sir George W. K. Roberts	January 1964	June 1964
Sir Leonard J. Knowles, CBE	1964	1972
Sir Gerald Cash, GCMG, GCVO, OBE, JP	1972	1973
Dame Doris Louise Johnson	1973	1982
Edwin Coleby	1982	1992
John Henry Bostwick	1992	May 2002
Sharon R. Wilson	May 2002	May 2007
Lynn Holowesko	May 2007	May 2012
Sharon R. Wilson	May 2012	May 2017
Katherine Forbes-Smith	May 2017	December 2019
Mildred Hall-Watson	December 2019	October 2021
Lashell Adderley	October 2021	Incumbent
