= Parliament of the Bahamas =

Bicameral legislature of The Bahamas

Parliament of The Bahamas
- 15th Bahamian Parliament

Type
- Type: Bicameral
- Houses: Senate; House of Assembly

History
- Founded: 4 March 1729; 297 years ago

Leadership
- Monarch: Charles III since 8 September 2022
- Governor-General: Dame Cynthia A. Pratt since 1 September 2023
- President of the Senate: Lashell Adderley, PLP since 6 October 2021
- Speaker: Patricia Deveaux, PLP since 6 October 2021
- Prime Minister: Philip Davis, PLP since 17 September 2021
- Leader of the Opposition: Michael Pintard, FNM since 27 November 2021

Structure
- Seats: Senate: 16 seats House: 41 seats
- Senate's political groups: HM Government: PLP (10); HM Most Loyal Opposition: FNM (6)
- House's political groups: HM Government: PLP (33); HM Most Loyal Opposition: FNM (8)

Elections
- House's voting system: First-past-the-post
- Last House's election: 12 May 2026
- Next House's election: 2031

Meeting place
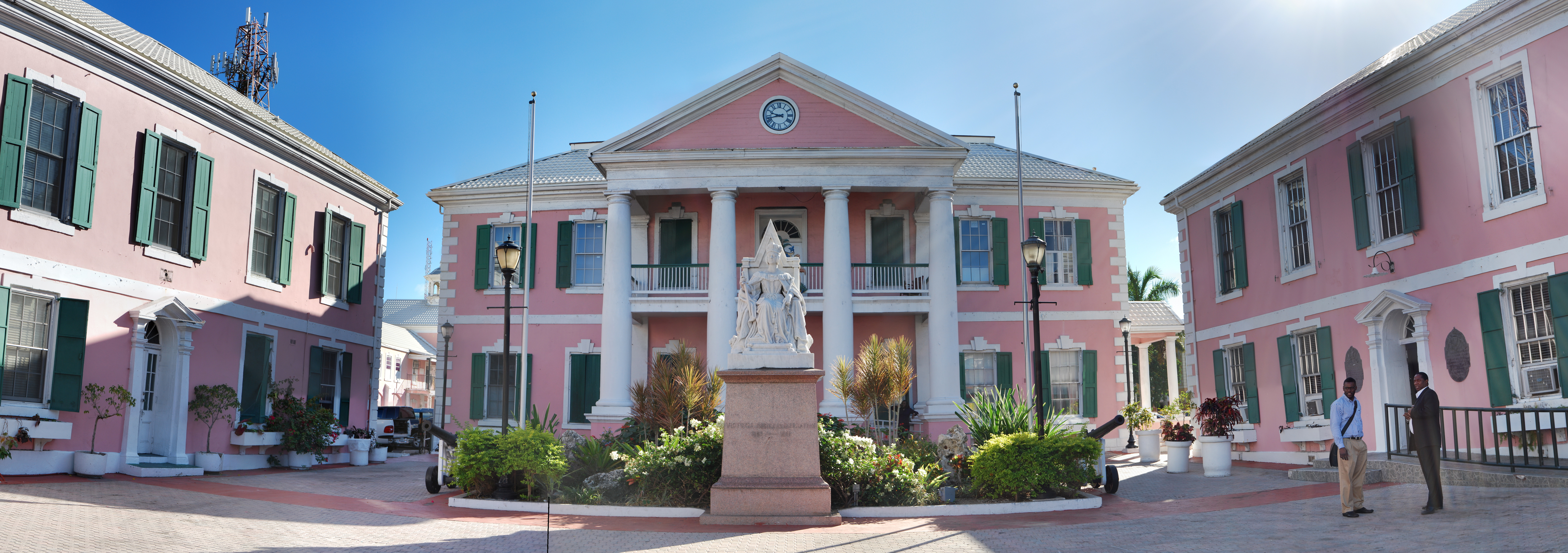
- Bahamian Parliament, Nassau, The Bahamas

The Parliament of The Bahamas is the bicameral national parliament of the Commonwealth of The Bahamas. The parliament is formally made up of the sovereign (represented by the governor-general), an appointed Senate, and an elected House of Assembly. It currently sits at the Bahamian Parliament Building in Nassau, the national capital.

The structure, functions, and procedures of the parliament are based on the Westminster system.

== History ==
Originally inhabited by the Lucayan people, a branch of the Arawakan-speaking Taino people, The Bahamas was the site of Columbus's first landfall in the New World in 1492. Although the Spanish never colonized The Bahamas, they shipped the native Lucayans to slavery in Hispaniola. The islands were mostly deserted from 1513 until 1648, when English colonists from Bermuda settled on the island of Eleuthera.

In 1670, King Charles II granted the islands to the lords proprietors of the Carolinas, who rented the islands from the king with rights of trading, tax, appointing governors, and administering the country. The Bahamas became a British crown colony in 1718, when the British clamped down on piracy.

A General Assembly was established in 1729; the first elections took place in September, and on 29 September 1729 twenty-four members representing the islands of New Providence, Eleuthera, and Harbour Island gathered together at the house of Samuel Lawford to form the assembly.

The Bahamas legislature has had a bicameral feature since its inception in 1729 as the Governor's Council performed both executive and legislative functions. In 1841 Governor Francis Cockburn divided Governors Council into two separate councils: The Executive Council to deal with executive functions and the Legislative Council to deal with legislative functions of the upper house. In 1841 the Bahamian legislature took on more structure, with the Legislative Council being the superior legislative body and the House of Assembly being the lesser. The Legislative Council eventually was renamed to the Senate in 1964 and became the weaker house while the House of Assembly became the superior legislative body. The Senate is however still known as the upper house and the House of Assembly still as the lower house.

Bahamians achieved self-government in 1964 and full independence within the Commonwealth of Nations on July 10, 1973, retaining Queen Elizabeth II as monarch. The Parliament as presently constituted was established by Chapter 5 of the Constitution of the Bahamas, which came into effect upon the country's independence from the United Kingdom.

== House of Assembly ==
The House of Assembly is the lower chamber. It consists of 41 members (known as members of parliament), elected from individual constituencies for five-year terms. As under the Westminster system, the government may dissolve the parliament and call elections at any time. The House of Assembly performs all major legislative functions. The prime minister is the leader of the party controlling the majority of the House of Assembly seats. Halson Moultrie was elected the new speaker of the House of Assembly on May 24, 2017.

=== Latest election ===
Party	Votes	%	Seats	+/–
Progressive Liberal Party	64,254	51.28	33	+1
Free National Movement	44,958	35.88	8	+1
Coalition of Independents	14,579	11.64	0	0
Independents	1,499	1.20	0	0
Total	125,290	100.00	41	+2
Registered voters/turnout	209,264	–		
Source: Bahamas Local

== Senate ==
The Senate (upper house) consists of 16 members appointed by the governor-general. Nine of these senators are selected on the advice of the prime minister, four on the advice of the leader of the opposition, and three on the advice of the prime minister after consultation with the leader of the opposition. The Senate is authorized by the Constitution to pass bills in the same manner as passed by the House or it can make such amendments to the bill should it consider it necessary. Those amendments will then have to be approved by the House of Assembly. The Senate may even reject a bill outrightly that had been passed by the House. However, if the House passes the bill in two successive sessions, and the Senate rejects the bill each time, the House of Assembly may send the bill directly to the governor-general without the Senate having consented to the bill.

If the House passes a money bill and sends that bill to the Senate for its consent, and if the Senate does not give its consent within a month after receiving the bill, the money bill is sent to the governor-general for assent even though the Senate had not consented to it.

In a historic vote, attorney Sharon Wilson was unanimously elected to a second term as president of the Senate, marking the first time a woman won re-election to head that legislative body. She previously served as president of the Senate from 2002 to 2007, and succeeded Lynn Holowesko, who served as president of the Senate from 2007 to 2012. She was succeeded by Katherine Forbes-Smith, then Mildred Hall-Watson and then Lashell Adderley.

== Legislative functions ==
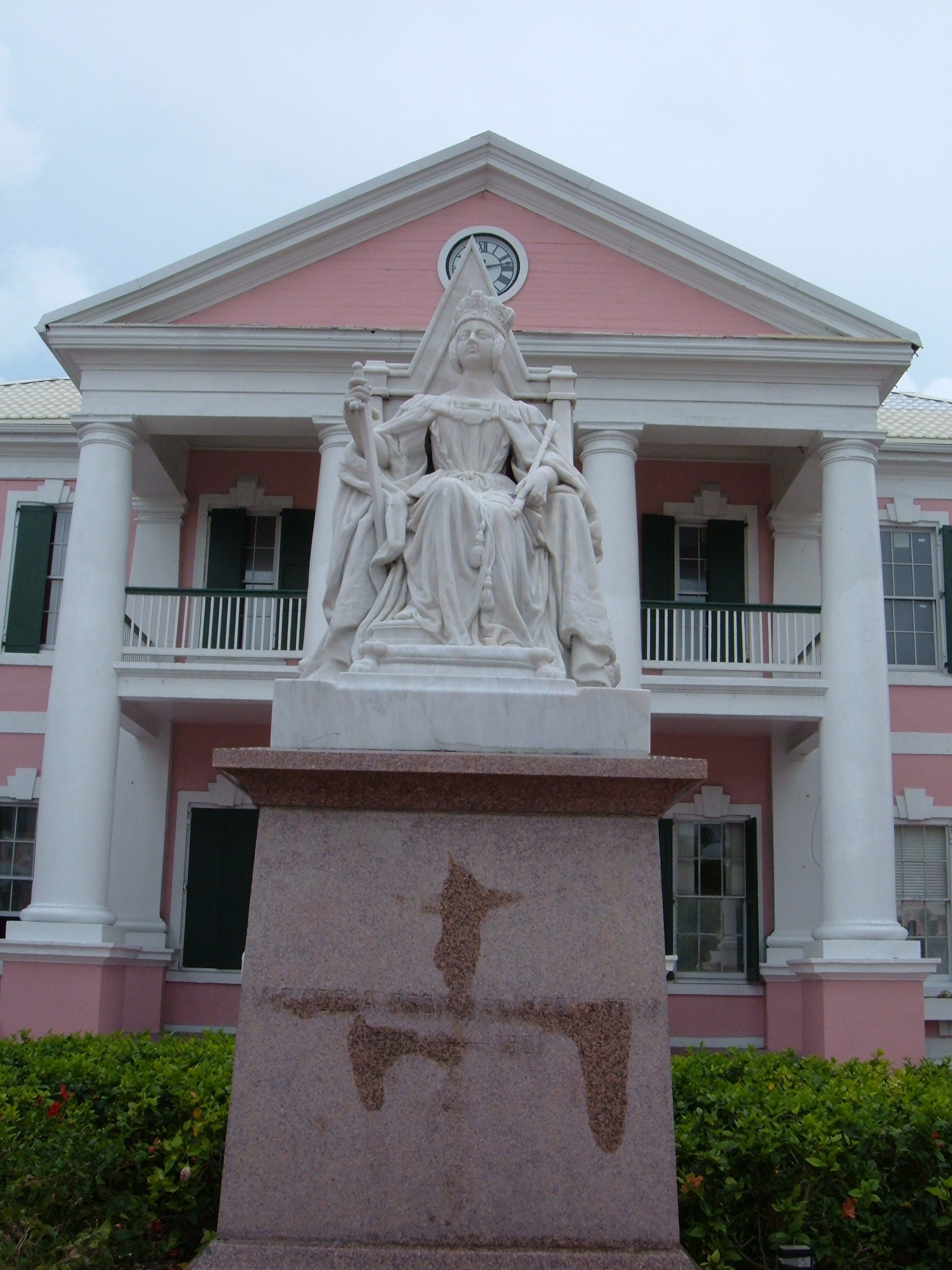
The statue of Queen Victoria, located in Parliament Square, was erected in her honour after her death in 1901

Parliament is empowered by Article 52(1) of the Constitution to make laws for the peace, order and good government of the Bahamas. The Constitution also empowers Parliament to:

- determine the privileges, immunities, powers, and procedures of both the Senate and the House of Assembly;
- alter or amend any of the provisions of the constitution;
- prescribe the officers who are to constitute the personal staff of the Governor-General;
- prescribe the number of Justices of the Supreme Court and Court of Appeal; and
- approve the Government's budget.

Parliament also maintains oversight of the government's finances through the Public Accounts Committee. Parliament is also the forum where public policy and matters of national importance are debated.

== Legislative procedure ==
Most of the laws passed by Parliament are for the modification or amendment of existing laws.

Article 52(2) of the Constitution empowers Parliament to make laws by the passing of a bill. Most bills are introduced into Parliament by a government minister, but in principle any parliamentarian may introduce a bill. A bill must be passed by both the House of Assembly and Senate, and then must be formally assented to by the governor-general, before it becomes law.

There are currently four main classifications of bills: public, money, private member, and private bills.

A bill must pass through a series of stages in order to be passed by each chamber, with a vote taken at each stage. The procedure in the House of Assembly is as follows:

1. A bill is formally introduced into Parliament at the first reading; this stage is generally a formality, with the bill's long title being read out and the presiding officer placing the motion without debate. After the first reading, the speaker orders the bill to be printed; it is then numbered, circulated to members of parliament, and made available to the public.
2. At the second reading, the principle of the bill is debated.
3. At the committal stage, the entire House of Assembly sits as a committee of the whole house, with the speaker leaving the chair and the deputy speaker presiding as chairperson. During this stage the bill is examined clause by clause, with detailed amendments considered. After the bill has been dealt with in committee, the chairperson formally reports to the speaker the outcome of the committee's deliberations, including what amendments have been made.
4. The third reading is the final stage; the motion made by the speaker for the third reading is usually agreed to without debate. once a bill has had its third reading, the speaker orders the bill passed, and instructs the chief clerk to take the bill to the Senate for its consideration.

Each bill consists of five main parts: the long title, the short title, the interpretation clause, the main body of the bill and the objects and reasons. The long title is a description of the nature of the bill and covers the intent of the bill. The short title follows the long title and labels the bill for identification purposes. The short title sometimes also contains the commencement clause, which states when the bill will have legal force. The short title in turn is followed by the interpretation clause, which defines certain words and phrases used in the bill. The body of the bill consists of all of the other clauses, which contain the provisions of the bill, that is, they contain all of the measures that the bill is enacting. The objects and reasons is the final part of a bill and it seeks to explain in layman's terms the purpose of the bill and the reason why it is necessary.

== Members ==
- 13th Bahamian Parliament
- 14th Bahamian Parliament
- 15th Bahamian Parliament
- List of members of the Parliament of the Bahamas

== See also ==
- List of presidents of the Senate of the Bahamas
- List of speakers of the House of Assembly of the Bahamas
- List of legislatures by country
