= Monarchy of the Bahamas =

King of the Bahamas
- Coat of arms of the Bahamas

Incumbent
- Charles III since 8 September 2022

Details
- Style: His Majesty
- Heir apparent: William, Prince of Wales
- First monarch: Elizabeth II
- Formed: 10 July 1973

The monarchy of the Bahamas is a system of government in which a hereditary monarch is the sovereign and head of state of the Commonwealth of The Bahamas. The current Bahamian monarch and head of state, since 8 September 2022, is King Charles III. As sovereign, he is the personal embodiment of the Bahamian Crown. Although the person of the sovereign is equally shared with 14 other independent countries within the Commonwealth of Nations, each country's monarchy is separate and legally distinct. As a result, the current monarch is officially titled King of the Commonwealth of The Bahamas and, in this capacity, he and other members of the royal family undertake public and private functions domestically and abroad as representatives of the Bahamian state. However, the King is the only member of the Royal Family with any constitutional role.

All executive authority is vested in the monarch, and royal assent is required for the Bahamian Parliament to enact laws and for letters patent and Orders in Council to have legal effect. Most of the powers are exercised by the elected members of parliament, the ministers of the Crown generally drawn from amongst them, and the judges and justices of the peace. Other powers vested in the monarch, such as dismissal of a prime minister, are significant but are treated only as reserve powers and as an important security part of the role of the monarchy.

The Crown today primarily functions as a guarantor of continuous and stable governance and a nonpartisan safeguard against the abuse of power. While some powers are exercisable only by the sovereign, most of the monarch's operational and ceremonial duties are exercised by his representative, the governor-general of the Bahamas.

== Origin ==
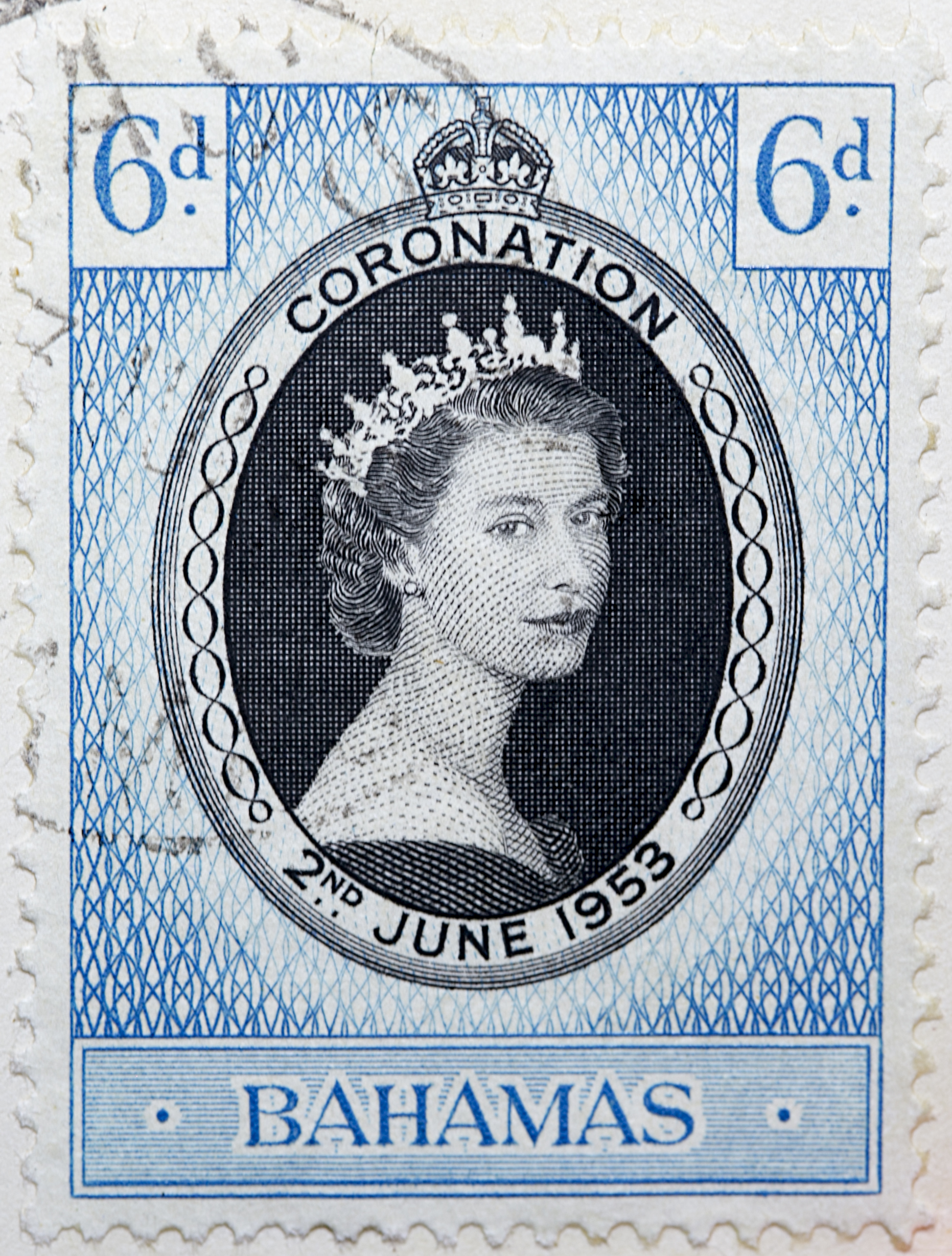
Coronation stamp, 1953

In 1629, King Charles I granted Robert Heath, attorney general, territories in America including "Bahama and all other Isles and Islands lying southerly there or neare upon the foresayd continent". Charles Towne was settled in 1660 and named for King Charles II, but its name was changed to Nassau after William III came to the throne; the German region Nassau was a holding of William's family.

The Bahamas became a British crown colony in 1718, when the British clamped down on piracy.

In August 1940, the Duke of Windsor was appointed Governor of the Bahamas. He arrived in the colony with his wife Wallis, Duchess of Windsor. The Duke was praised at the time for his efforts to combat poverty on the islands.

In May 1963, a conference was held in London to consider a new constitution for the islands. The islands were granted full internal self-government, with the governor retaining reserved powers only for foreign affairs, defense, and internal security.

External videos
- Bahamas: Prince Charles at Independence Ceremony (1973) Source: British Pathé.

On 10 July 1973, Charles, Prince of Wales delivered the official documents to Prime Minister Lynden Pindling, officially declaring the Bahamas a fully independent nation within the Commonwealth of Nations. Shortly after independence, Sir John Paul was appointed the first governor-general of the Bahamas, the vice-regal representative of Elizabeth II, Queen of the Bahamas.

In 2013, Charles, while reminiscing about officiating at independence celebrations on behalf of the Queen, said:

I remember in those days I was young enough to be able to attend three – not one – but three, Independence Balls in the same night! That was quite an undertaking and I have never forgotten dancing with Mrs Pindling, who was the wife of the then Prime Minister of the Bahamas, and a whole lot of other remarkable ladies in the Bahamas.

== The Bahamian Crown and its aspects ==
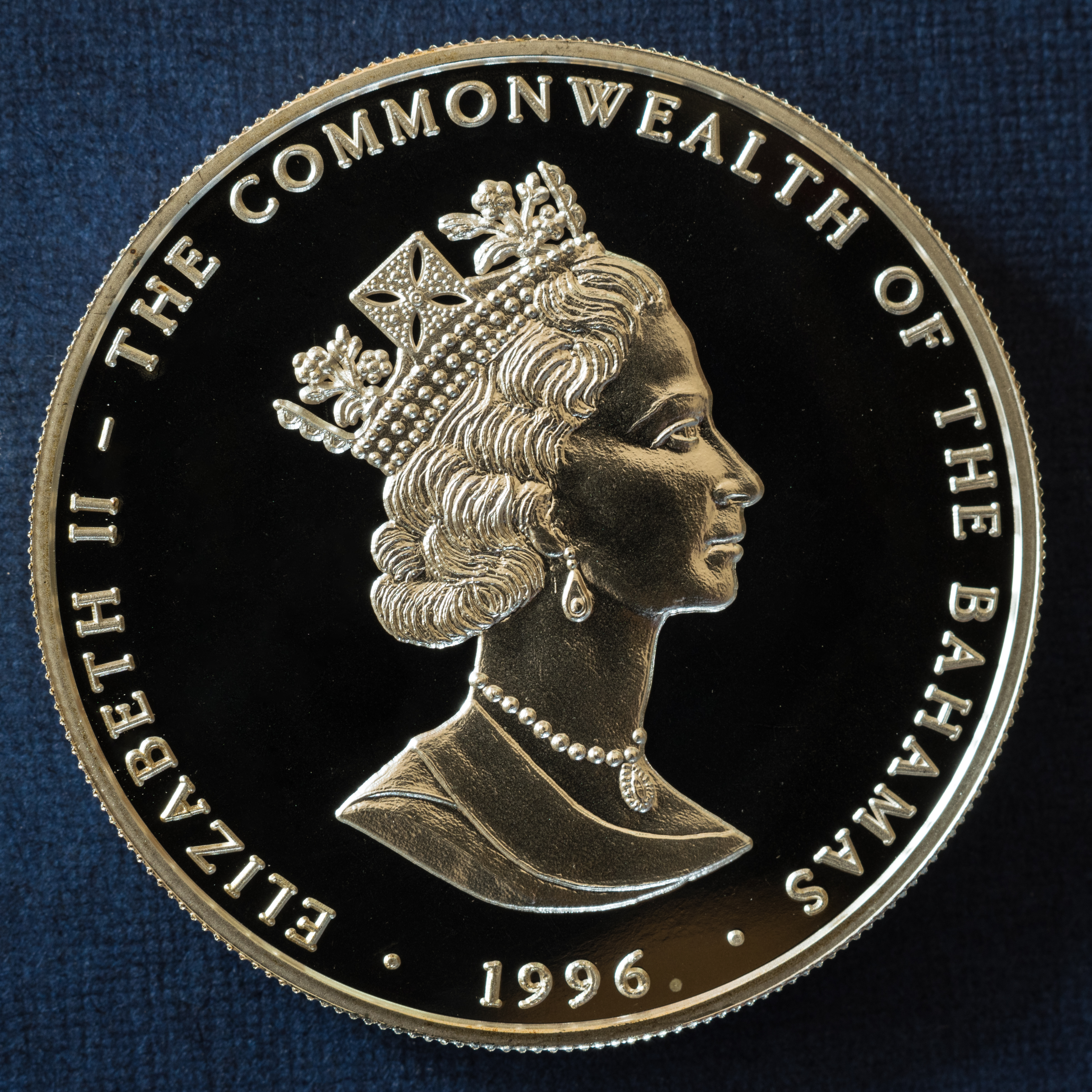
Queen Elizabeth II on a 1996 Bahamian 1-dollar coin

The Bahamas is one of fifteen independent nations, known as Commonwealth realms, which shares its sovereign with other monarchies in the Commonwealth of Nations, with the monarch's relationship with the Bahamas completely independent from his position as monarch of any other realm. Despite sharing the same person as their respective monarch, each of the Commonwealth realms – including the Bahamas – is sovereign and independent of the others. The Bahamian monarch is represented by a viceroy—the governor-general of the Bahamas—in the Bahamian realm.

I recall with great fondness my visit to The Bahamas in 1973 to attend the National Independence celebrations. Since that time, I have followed with particular interest and affection as The Bahamas have grown in strength and responded to a multitude of challenges with resilience and fortitude.

— Charles III of the Bahamas, 2023

Since Bahamian independence in 1973, the pan-national Crown has had both a shared and a separate character and the sovereign's role as monarch of the Bahamas is distinct to his or her position as monarch of any other realm, including the United Kingdom. The monarchy thus ceased to be an exclusively British institution and in the Bahamas became a Bahamian, or "domesticated" establishment.

This division is illustrated in a number of ways: The sovereign, for example, holds a unique Bahamian title and, when he is acting in public specifically as a representative of the Bahamas, he uses, where possible, Bahamian symbols, including the country's national flag, unique royal symbols, and the like. Only Bahamian government ministers can advise the sovereign on matters of the Bahamian state.

The flag of the Bahamian governor-general featuring the St Edward's Crown

In the Bahamas, the legal personality of the State is referred to as "His Majesty the King in Right of The Bahamas".

=== Title ===
Shortly after independence, Elizabeth II, at the request of the Prime Minister of the Bahamas, adopted separate and distinct style and titles in her role as Queen of the Bahamas. Per a proclamation on 10 August 1973, the Queen's style and titles in relation to the Bahamas became: Elizabeth the Second, by the Grace of God, Queen of the Commonwealth of the Bahamas and of Her other Realms and Territories, Head of the Commonwealth.

Since the accession of Charles III, the monarch's title is: Charles the Third, by the Grace of God King of the Commonwealth of The Bahamas and of His other Realms and Territories, Head of the Commonwealth.

This style communicates the Bahamas's status as an independent monarchy, highlighting the Monarch's role specifically as Sovereign of the Bahamas, as well as the shared aspect of the Crown throughout the realms. Typically, the Sovereign is styled "King of the Bahamas," and is addressed as such when in the Bahamas, or performing duties on behalf of the Bahamas abroad.

=== Oath of allegiance ===
As the embodiment of the state, the monarch is the locus of oaths of Allegiance. This is done in reciprocation to the sovereign's Coronation Oath, wherein they promise to govern the peoples of their realms, "according to their respective laws and customs".

The oath of allegiance in the Bahamas is:

"I, (name), do swear that I will be faithful and bear true allegiance to His Majesty King Charles the Third, His Heirs and Successors, according to law. So help me God."

=== Succession ===
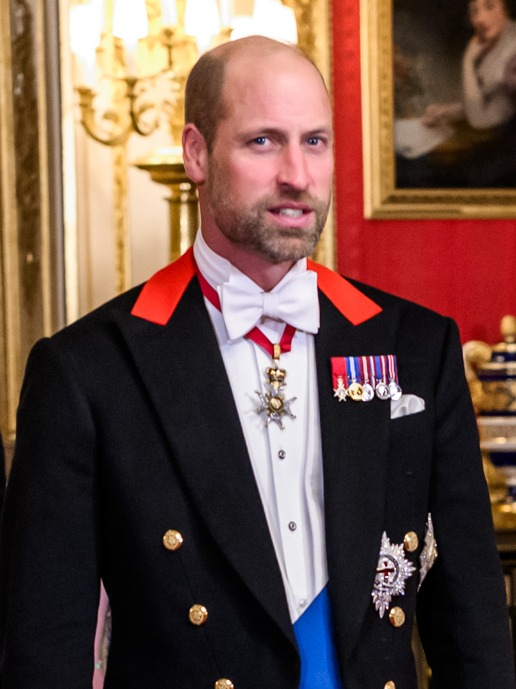
William, Prince of Wales, is the current heir apparent to the Bahamian throne

Like some realms, the Bahamas defers to United Kingdom law to determine the line of succession.

Succession is by absolute primogeniture governed by the provisions of the Succession to the Crown Act 2013, as well as the Act of Settlement 1701, and the Bill of Rights 1689. This legislation limits the succession to the natural (i.e. non-adopted), legitimate descendants of Sophia, Electress of Hanover, and stipulates that the monarch cannot be a Roman Catholic, and must be in communion with the Church of England upon ascending the throne. Though these constitutional laws, as they apply to the Bahamas, still lie within the control of the British parliament, both the United Kingdom and the Bahamas cannot change the rules of succession without the unanimous consent of the other realms, unless explicitly leaving the shared monarchy relationship; a situation that applies identically in all the other realms, and which has been likened to a treaty amongst these countries.

Here in The Bahamas, the death of our monarch, and the accession of her heir is both a constitutional and institutional moment of transition.

— Prime Minister Philip Davis on the death of Elizabeth II, Queen of the Bahamas, 2022

Upon a demise of the Crown (the death or abdication of a sovereign), it is customary for the accession of the new monarch to be publicly proclaimed by the governor-general in the capital, Nassau, after the accession. Regardless of any proclamations, the late sovereign's heir immediately and automatically succeeds, without any need for confirmation or further ceremony. An appropriate period of mourning also follows, during which flags across the country are flown at half-mast to honour the late monarch. The day of the funeral is likely to be a public holiday.

== Constitutional role and royal prerogative ==
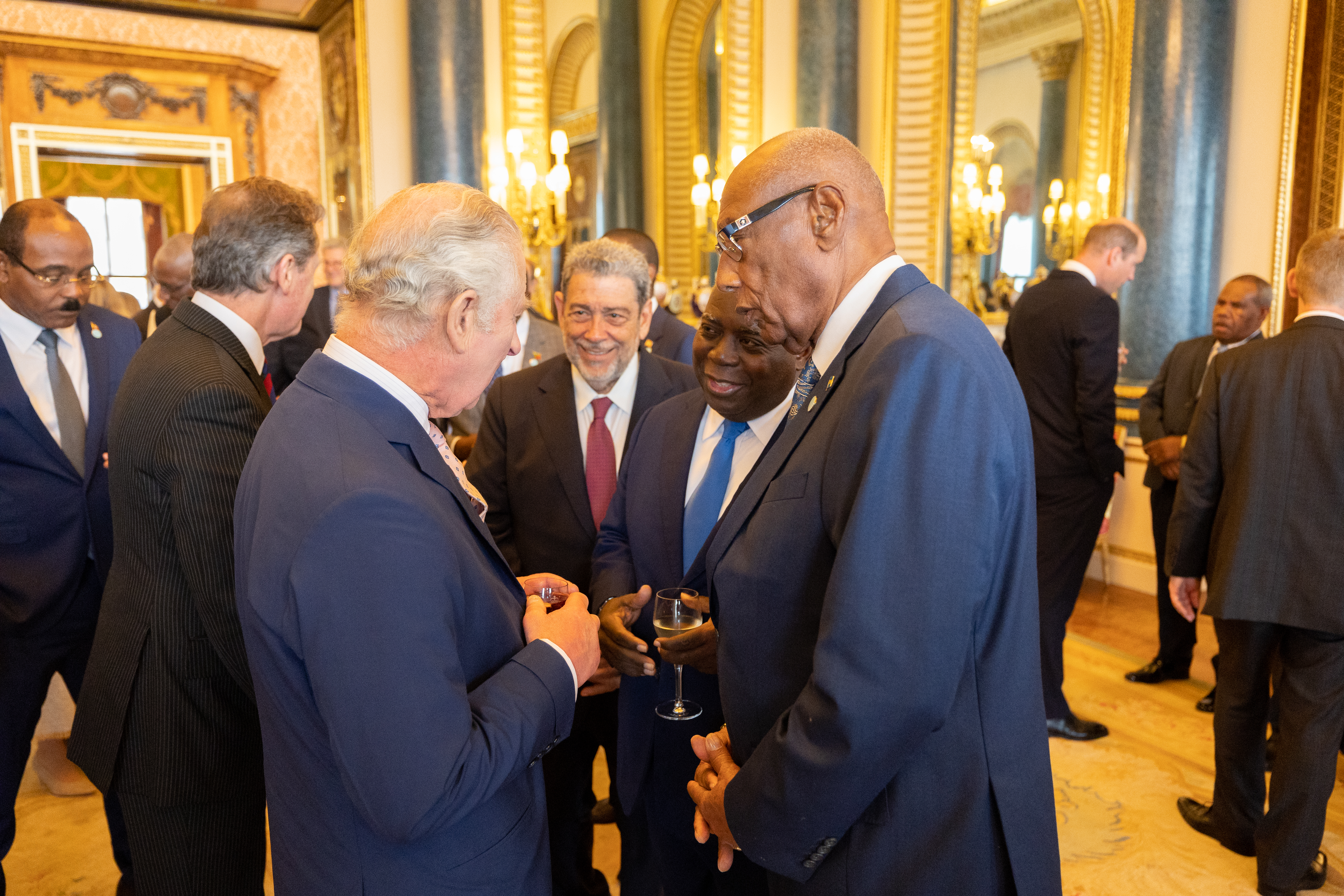
King Charles III speaking with Governor-General Cornelius A. Smith and Prime Minister Philip Davis at Buckingham Palace, 2023

The Bahamian constitution is made up of a variety of statutes and conventions which gives the Bahamas a parliamentary system of government under a constitutional monarchy, wherein the role of the monarch and governor-general is both legal and practical, but not political. The Crown is regarded as a corporation, in which several parts share the authority of the whole, with the sovereign as the person at the centre of the constitutional construct, meaning all powers of state are constitutionally reposed in the Bahamian monarch. The government of the Bahamas is also thus formally referred to as His Majesty's Government.

Most of the monarch's domestic duties are performed by the governor-general, appointed by the monarch on the advice of the Prime Minister of the Bahamas.

All institutions of government act under the sovereign's authority; the vast powers that belong to the Bahamian Crown are collectively known as the Royal prerogative. Parliamentary approval is not required for the exercise of the Royal Prerogative; moreover, the consent of the Crown is a must before either of the houses of parliament may even debate a bill affecting the sovereign's prerogatives or interests.

=== Executive ===
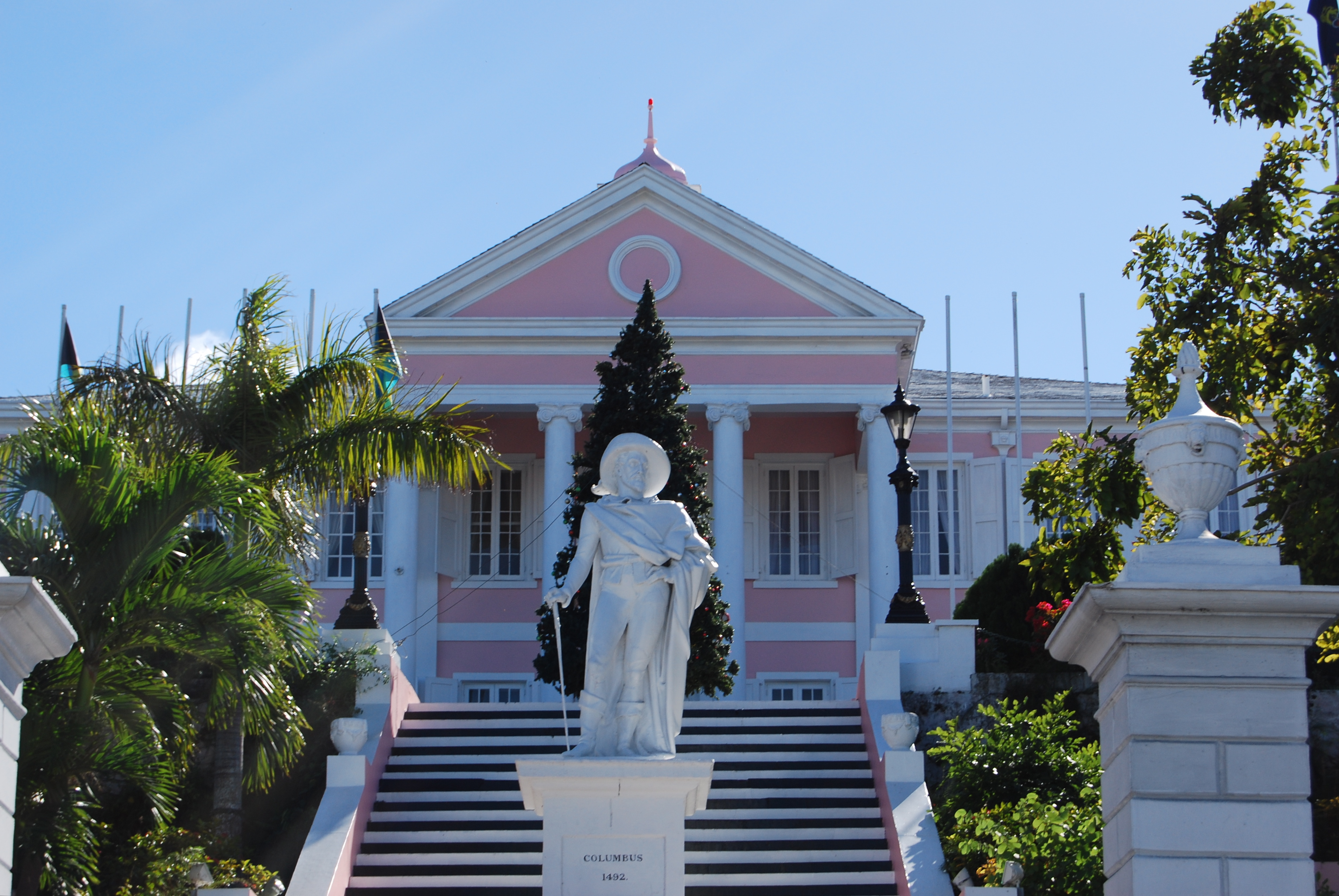
Government House, Nassau, the official residence of the governor-general of the Bahamas

One of the main duties of the Crown is to appoint a prime minister, who thereafter heads the Bahamian cabinet and advises the monarch or governor-general on how to execute their executive powers over all aspects of government operations and foreign affairs. The monarch's, and thereby the viceroy's role is almost entirely symbolic and cultural, acting as a symbol of the legal authority under which all governments and agencies operate, while the Cabinet directs the use of the Royal Prerogative, which includes the privilege to declare war, maintain the King's peace, and direct the actions of the Royal Bahamas Defence Force, as well as to summon and prorogue parliament and call elections. However, the Royal Prerogative belongs to the Crown and not to any of the ministers, though it might have sometimes appeared that way, and the constitution allows the governor-general to unilaterally use these powers in relation to the dismissal of a prime minister, dissolution of parliament, and removal of a judge in exceptional, constitutional crisis situations.

There are also a few duties which are specifically performed by the monarch, such as appointing the governor-general.

The governor-general, to maintain the stability of the Bahamian government, appoints as prime minister the individual most likely to maintain the support of the Bahamian House of Assembly. The governor-general additionally appoints a Cabinet, at the direction of the prime minister, at least eight other ministers of the Crown. The monarch is informed by his viceroy of the acceptance of the resignation of a prime minister and the swearing-in of a new prime minister and other members of the ministry, and he remains fully briefed through regular communications from his Bahamian ministers. Members of various executive agencies and other officials are appointed by the Crown. The appointment of senators, and Supreme Court justices also falls under the Royal Prerogative.

=== Foreign affairs ===
The Royal Prerogative further extends to foreign affairs: the governor-general ratifies treaties, alliances, and international agreements. As with other uses of the Royal Prerogative, no parliamentary approval is required. However, a treaty cannot alter the domestic laws of the Bahamas; an Act of Parliament is necessary in such cases. The governor-general, on behalf of the monarch, also accredits Bahamian High Commissioners and ambassadors and receives diplomats from foreign states. In addition, the issuance of passports falls under the Royal Prerogative and, as such, all Bahamian passports are issued in the governor-general's name, the monarch's representative in the Bahamas.

=== Parliament ===
You have achieved independence; social and political advance has kept pace with economic change; and the firm resolution of the Bahamian people has guided your country along a natural and peaceful path of progress. I congratulate the Government and people of The Bahamas on their long and unbroken history of parliamentary government and for maintaining so high a standard of order and stability in the midst of rapid change.

— Elizabeth II of the Bahamas, 1979

The sovereign, along with the Senate and the House of Assembly, is one of the three components of the Bahamian parliament.

The monarch does not, however, participate in the legislative process; the viceroy does, though only in the granting of royal assent. Further, the constitution outlines that the governor-general alone is responsible for appointing senators. The viceroy must make nine senatorial appointments on the advice of the prime minister, four on the advice of leader of the opposition, and three on the advice of both. The viceroy additionally summons, prorogues, and dissolves parliament; after the latter, the writs for a general election are usually signed by the governor-general at Government House, Nassau.

The new parliamentary session is marked by the Opening of Parliament, during which the monarch or the governor-general reads the Speech from the Throne.

All laws in the Bahamas are enacted only with the viceroy's granting of royal assent in the monarch's name. The royal assent, and proclamation, are required for all acts of parliament, usually granted or withheld by the governor-general, with the Public Seal of the Bahamas.

=== Courts ===
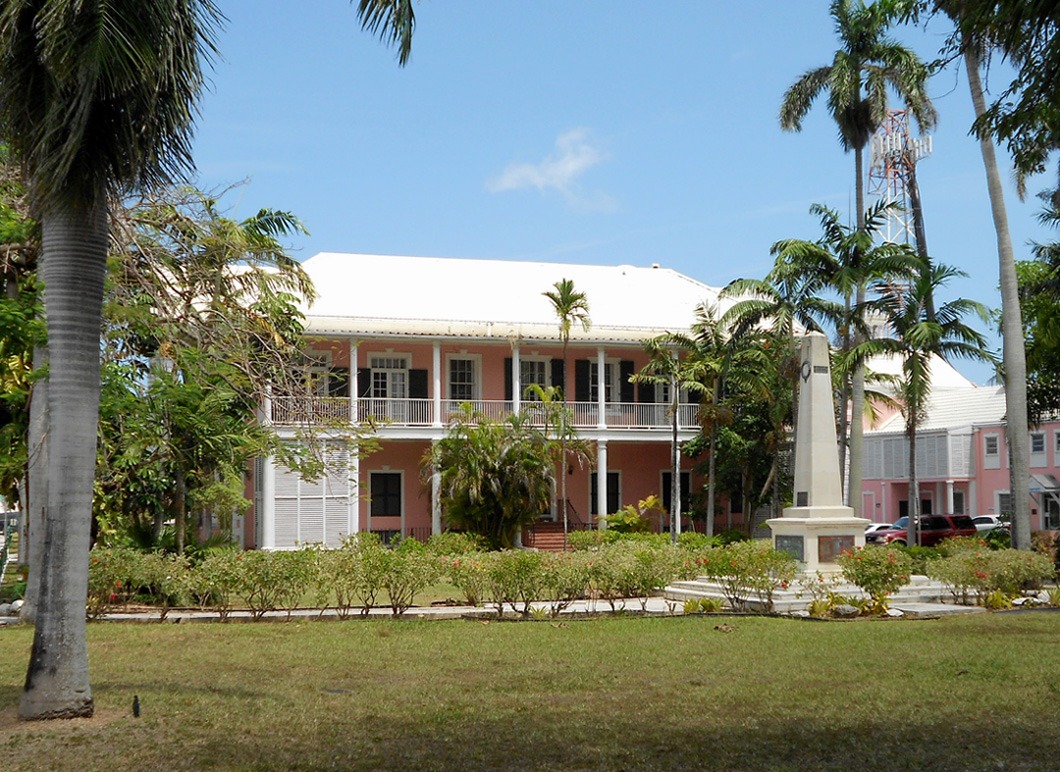
Supreme Court of the Bahamas, Nassau

Within the Commonwealth realms, the sovereign is responsible for rendering justice for all his subjects, and is thus traditionally deemed the fount of justice. In the Bahamas, criminal offences are legally deemed to be offences against the sovereign and proceedings for indictable offences are brought in the sovereign's name in the form of The King [or Queen] versus [Name]. Hence, the common law holds that the sovereign "can do no wrong"; the monarch cannot be prosecuted in his or her own courts for criminal offences.

All justices of the Supreme Court are appointed by the governor-general. On taking office, all Bahamian judges are required to swear an oath to the monarch. Under the Official Oaths Act, the Judicial Oath is:

"I, (name), do swear that I will well and truly serve His Majesty King Charles the Third, His Heirs and Successors, in the office of ________ and will do right to all manner of people after the laws and usages of the Bahamas without fear or favour, affection or ill will. So help me God."

The governor-general, on behalf of the Bahamian monarch, can also grant immunity from prosecution, exercise the royal prerogative of mercy, and pardon offences against the Crown, either before, during, or after a trial. The exercise of the 'Prerogative of mercy' to grant a pardon and the commutation of prison sentences is described in section 90 of the Constitution.

== Cultural role ==
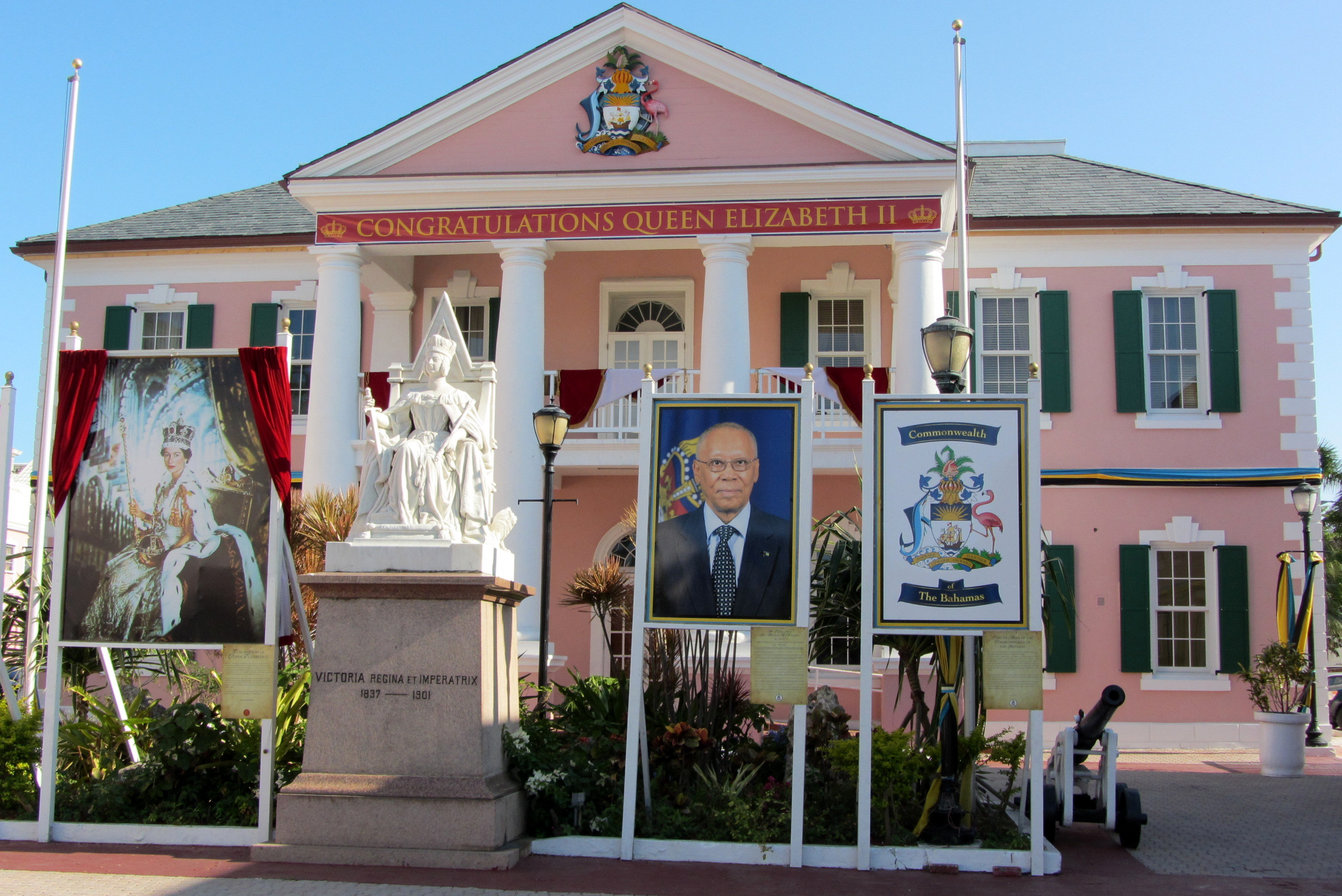
Parliament Square in Nassau decorated with posters and signs for the Diamond Jubilee of Queen Elizabeth II in 2012

The Bahamian monarch sends congratulatory messages to Bahamian citizens celebrating their 100th birthday, and to married couples on their 50th and 60th wedding anniversaries.

=== The Crown and Honours ===
Within the Commonwealth realms, the monarch is deemed the fount of honour. Similarly, the monarch, as Sovereign of the Bahamas, confers awards and honours in the Bahamas in his name. Most of them are often awarded on the advice of "His Majesty's Bahamas Ministers".

Through the passage of the National Honours Act 2016, the Bahamas established seven national orders on 27 January 2016. The monarch's vice-regal representative, the governor-general, serves as the Chancellor of all these orders.

=== The Crown and the Defence Force ===
The Crown sits at the pinnacle of the Bahamian Defence Force. It is reflected in the Bahamas' naval vessels, which bear the prefix HMBS, i.e., His Majesty's Bahamian Ship.

The Defence Force of the Bahamas is known as "The Royal Bahamas Defence Force". The monarch is the Head of the RBDF.

In September 1979, Princess Anne visited the Bahamas Defence Force Base at Coral Harbour, and unveiled a plaque designating the Base as "Her Majesty's Bahamian Ship Coral Harbour". The Princess officially conferred the title "Royal" on the Force, making it known thereafter as the "Royal Bahamas Defence Force".

Every member of the Royal Bahamas Defence Force has to swear allegiance to the Bahamian monarch on taking office. The oath is:

"I, (name), swear by Almighty God that I will be faithful and bear true allegiance to His Majesty King Charles the Third, His Heirs and Successors, according to law, and that I will, as in duty bound, honestly and faithfully defend the Commonwealth of The Bahamas against all enemies, and will observe and obey all lawful orders of Commander Defence Force and of the officers, warrant officers and marines set above me."

=== The Crown and the Police Force ===
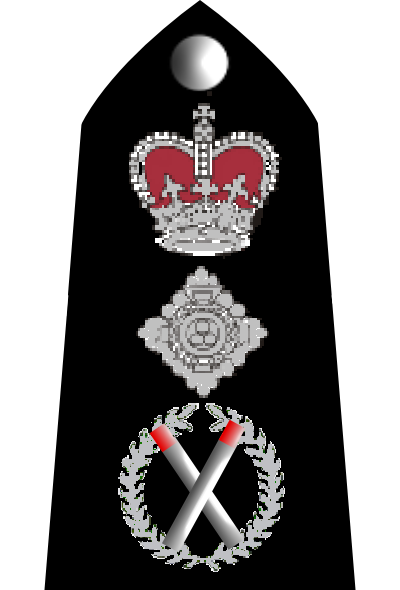
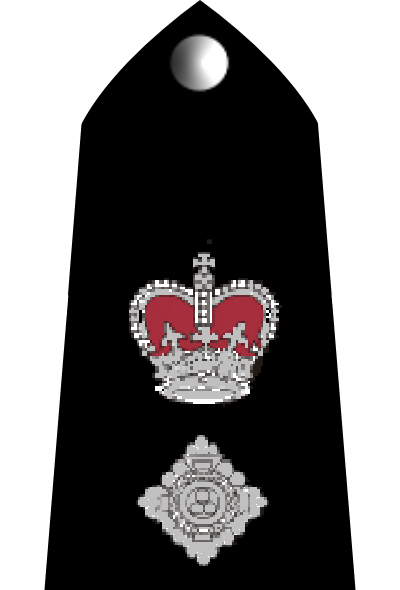
The rank insignia of a Bahamian Commissioner (left), Superintendent (centre) and Sergeant (right) of the Royal Bahamas Police Force featuring the St Edward's Crown

The national police force of Thamas is known as "The Royal Bahamas Police Force".

The St. Edward's Crown appears on the Bahamian Police's badges and rank insignia, which illustrates the monarchy as the locus of authority.

Every member of the Royal Bahamas Police Force has to swear allegiance to the monarch of the Bahamas, on taking office. Under the Bahamian Police Service Act, the oath of office, which is to be taken after the oath of allegiance, is:

"I, (name), do swear that I will well and truly serve our Sovereign lord the King, in the office of _____ without favour or affection, malice or ill will, and that I will cause His Majesty's peace to be kept and preserved; and that I will prevent, to the utmost of my power, all offences against the same; and while I shall continue to hold the said office I will, to the best of my skill and knowledge, discharge all the duties thereof faithfully according to law. So help me God."

=== Bahamian royal symbols ===
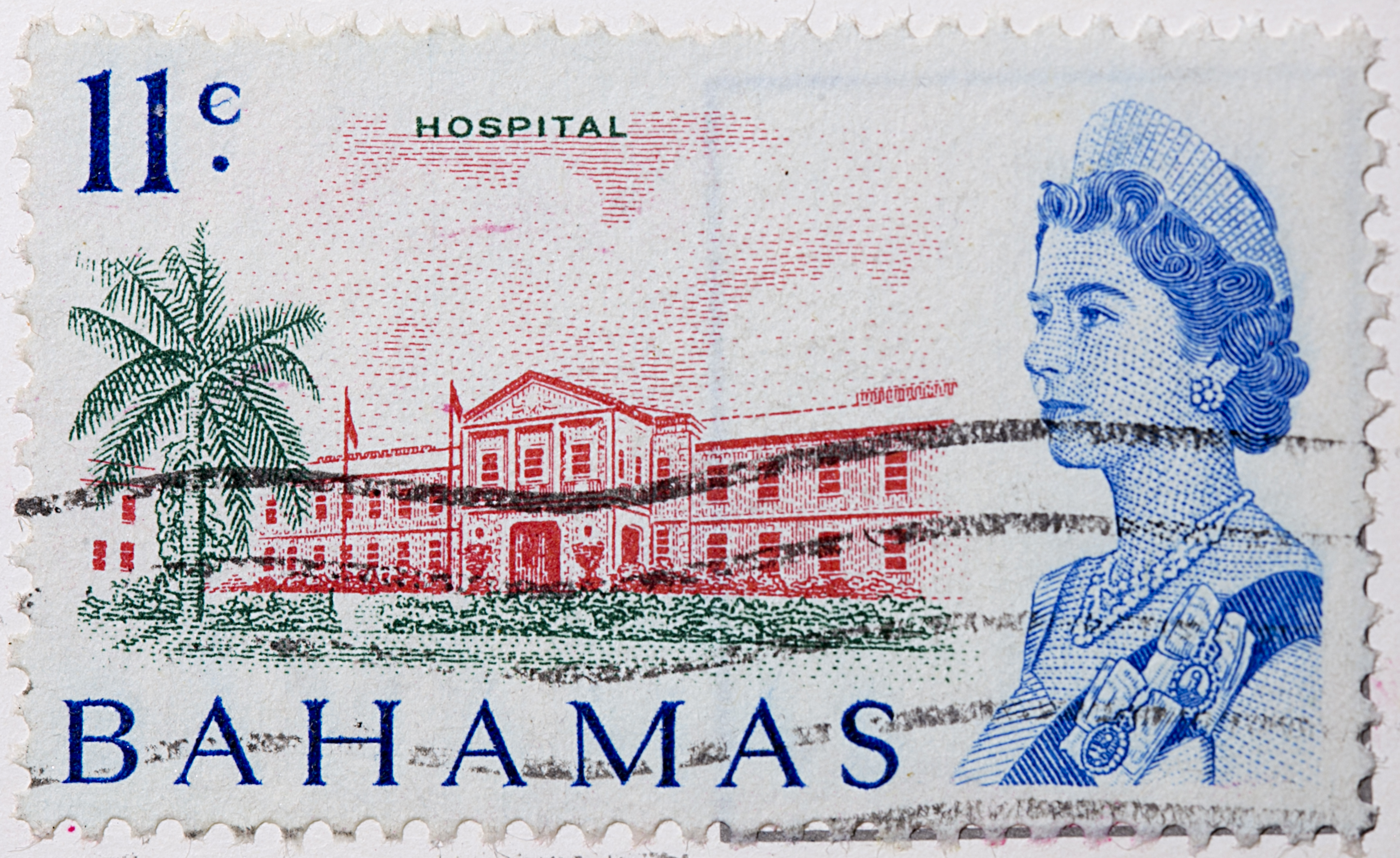
The Queen on a Bahamian stamp

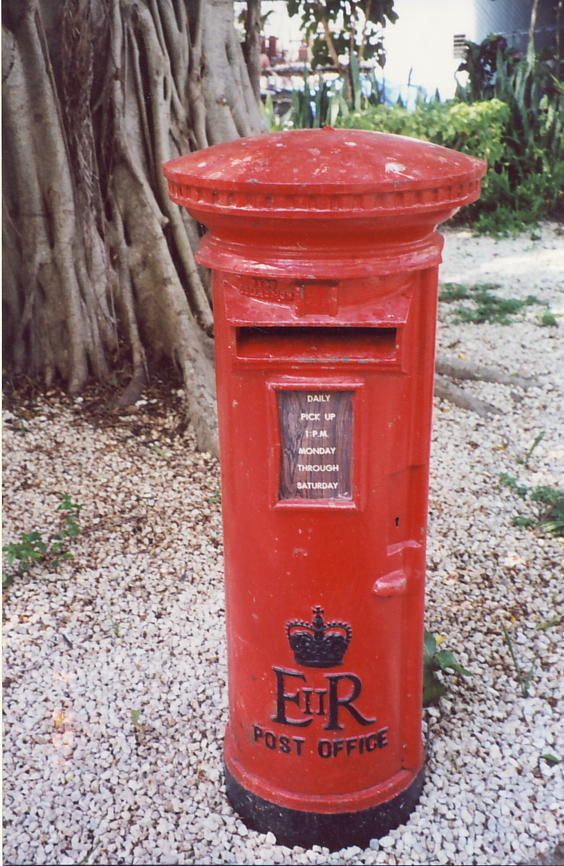
A post box in the Bahamas featuring the Queen Elizabeth II's royal cypher

The main symbol of the Bahamian monarchy is the sovereign himself. Thus, framed portraits of him are displayed in public buildings and government offices. Banknotes in the Bahamas feature the monarch's portrait on the obverse. The monarch also appears on commemorative Bahamian stamps.

A crown is also used to illustrate the monarchy as the locus of authority, appearing on police force, postal workers, prison officers rank insignia.

God Save the King is the royal anthem of the Bahamas.

Under the Bahamian Oath of Citizenship, new Bahamian citizens have to take a pledge of allegiance to the monarch of the Bahamas, and his heirs and successors.

=== Royal visits ===
I am delighted to be able to convey to you all a message of good wishes from my grandmother, The Queen of The Bahamas, on the occasion of her Platinum Jubilee. The Queen has fond memories of her many visits here to the Bahamas. From speaking to people today, including lots of excited school children across the family islands this morning, it is touching to see your deep admiration for The Queen and her seventy years of dedicated service to the Commonwealth.

— The Duke of Cambridge, 2022

Members of the royal family have toured the Bahamas on several occasions.

As part of larger Caribbean tours, the islands were visited by Queen Elizabeth II and her husband Prince Philip, Duke of Edinburgh, in February 1966. In July 1973, Charles, Prince of Wales represented the Queen at the Bahamian independence celebrations in Nassau. The Queen and her husband returned to the islands in February 1975, and again during her Silver Jubilee tour in October 1977. Princess Anne visited the Bahamas in 1979 with her husband Captain Mark Phillips to commemorate 250 years of Bahamian parliamentary democracy. In her congratulatory message, the Queen said, "As Queen of The Bahamas I am very happy to send greetings and best wishes to the Government and people of the Commonwealth of The Bahamas on this historic occasion. I am especially pleased that my daughter is able to join in your celebrations".

Charles and Diana, the Prince and Princess of Wales, visited in 1982 for a 10-day vacation. The Queen and Prince Philp visited Nassau for the Commonwealth Heads of Government Meeting in October 1985. The Queen and the Duke visited again in March 1994.

The Bahamas holds a special place in Her Majesty's heart. Her love for this realm and you, the Bahamian people, stretches back over the decades, right to that first visit in 1966.

— Prince Henry of Wales, 2012

Prince Harry visited the Bahamas in March 2012, during his tour of the Caribbean to mark the Queen's Diamond Jubilee. In a speech he said that the country's motto "encapsulates The Queen's extraordinary life-long commitment to service and community: 'Forward, Upward, Onward, Together'". The Princess Royal visited the Bahamas in 2015. The Earl and Countess of Wessex visited in 2016.

External videos
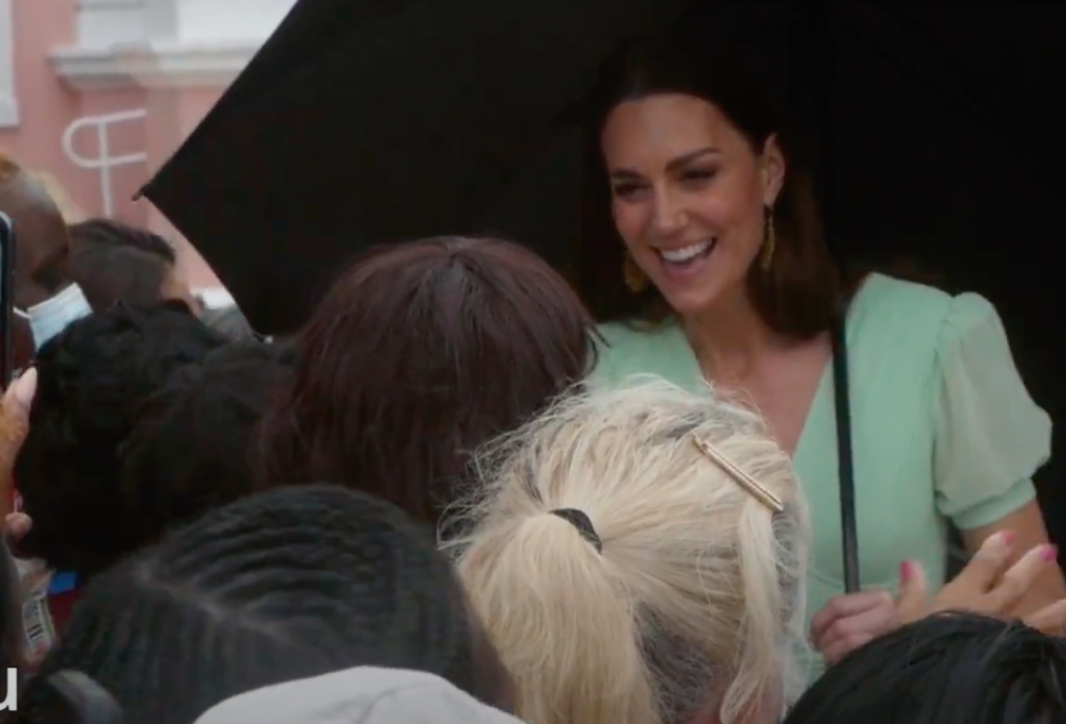
- The Duchess of Cambridge during a walkabout in Downtown Nassau, 2022
- The Royal Visit 2022 | Garden of Remembrance Source: The Office of the Prime Minister The Bahamas.

The Duke and Duchess of Cambridge toured the country in March 2022, to mark the Queen's Platinum Jubilee. The Earl and Countess of Wessex visited in February 2023 to attend a Governor General’s Youth Awards (GGYA) Gold Award Ceremony.

The Bahamas is known and admired the world over, not just for its astounding natural beauty, but for the depth of talent these islands produce – no country in the world has won more gold medals per capita, and I’m sure few can claim as many athletes, sailors, climate scientists, or performing artists as The Bahamas does.

— Charles III of the Bahamas, 2026

King Charles III made his first visit as King of the Bahamas from 27 to 29 October 2026. In Nassau, the King attended a youth rally at Clifford Park, visited the Royal Bahamas Defence Force base, where he paid tribute to fallen members of the force, and visited Bonefish Pond National Park and the Bahamas Boxing Academy. At Parliament Square, the King met representatives of the government, parliament and judiciary and watched and danced in a Junkanoo parade. On 28 October, at Government House, the King held audiences with the Governor-General of the Bahamas, Cynthia Pratt, and the Prime Minister, Philip Davis. On the same day, he attended a garden reception hosted by the Governor-General, which was attended by representatives of state institutions and members of the public. The visit highlighted the Bahamas’ ties with the Commonwealth and the importance of youth development, environmental protection and the preservation of cultural heritage.

== Debate ==
The monarchy has not been a major topic of debate in the Bahamas. The Constitutional Commission, which recommends making the governor-general president, has found "mixed feelings" on the matter, with a significant number of respondents being indifferent. In 2020, former Attorney General Sean McWeeney stated the Bahamas' transition to a republic may be "inevitable" at some point, but that there is no real appetite or momentum among the Bahamian public for it yet, nor is there mainstream political will. There are some minor and new republican parties such as Coalition of Independents (COI).

Following the proclamation of accession of Charles III, Prime Minister Philip Davis announced his government's intention to hold a referendum on becoming a republic. In 2023, a slight majority of Bahamians supported the transition to a republic, while the year before there had been more support for the continuation of the monarchy and no strong feelings about becoming a republic.

== List of Bahamian monarchs ==
Portrait	Regnal name (Birth–Death)	Reign over the Bahamas		Full name	Consort	House
Portrait	Regnal name (Birth–Death)	Start	End	Full name	Consort	House
	Elizabeth II (1926–2022)	10 July 1973	8 September 2022	Elizabeth Alexandra Mary	Philip Mountbatten	Windsor
	Elizabeth II (1926–2022)	Governors-general: Sir John Paul, Sir Milo Butler, Sir Gerald Cash, Sir Henry Milton Taylor, Sir Clifford Darling, Sir Orville Turnquest, Dame Ivy Dumont, Arthur Dion Hanna, Sir Arthur Foulkes, Dame Marguerite Pindling, Sir Cornelius A. Smith; Prime ministers: Sir Lynden Pindling, Hubert Ingraham, Perry Christie, Hubert Minnis, Philip Davis				
	Charles III (b. 1948)	8 September 2022	present	Charles Philip Arthur George	Camilla Shand	Windsor
	Charles III (b. 1948)	Governors-general: Sir Cornelius A. Smith, Dame Cynthia A. Pratt; Prime ministers: Philip Davis				

== See also ==
- The Bahamas Platinum Jubilee Sailing Regatta
- Lists of office-holders
- List of prime ministers of Elizabeth II
- List of prime ministers of Charles III
- List of Commonwealth visits made by Elizabeth II
- Monarchies in the Americas
- List of monarchies
