= Frank Watson (Bahamas politician) =

Bahamian civil servant and politician (born 1940)

Deputy Prime Minister of the Bahamas
- In office 1995–2002
- Prime Minister: Hubert Ingraham
- Preceded by: Orville Turnquest
- Succeeded by: Cynthia A. Pratt

Personal details
- Born: March 24, 1940 (age 86)
- Party: Free National Movement

Frank Howard Watson (born 24 March 1940) is a Bahamian civil servant and politician from Free National Movement.

== Early life ==
The son of William and Olga (née Major) Watson, Watson was born in Long Island, Bahamas. Watson attended Government High School before joining the Customs Department.

He served as Deputy Comptroller of Customs from 1969 to 1977.

== Political career ==
In 1977 and 1982, he ran for election in the Carmichael Constituency. He was elected to office in 1982 and reelected in 1987. In 1992, he was elected as a member of Parliament of the Bahamas for Adelaide.

Watson served in a number of cabinet posts. He was appointed Minister of Public Affairs and Public Enterprise from 1997 to 2002. He was appointed as Deputy Prime Minister of the Bahamas from 1995 to 2002. He was succeeded by Cynthia Pratt.
