= Ministry of Foreign Affairs (The Bahamas) =

Government ministry of the Bahamas

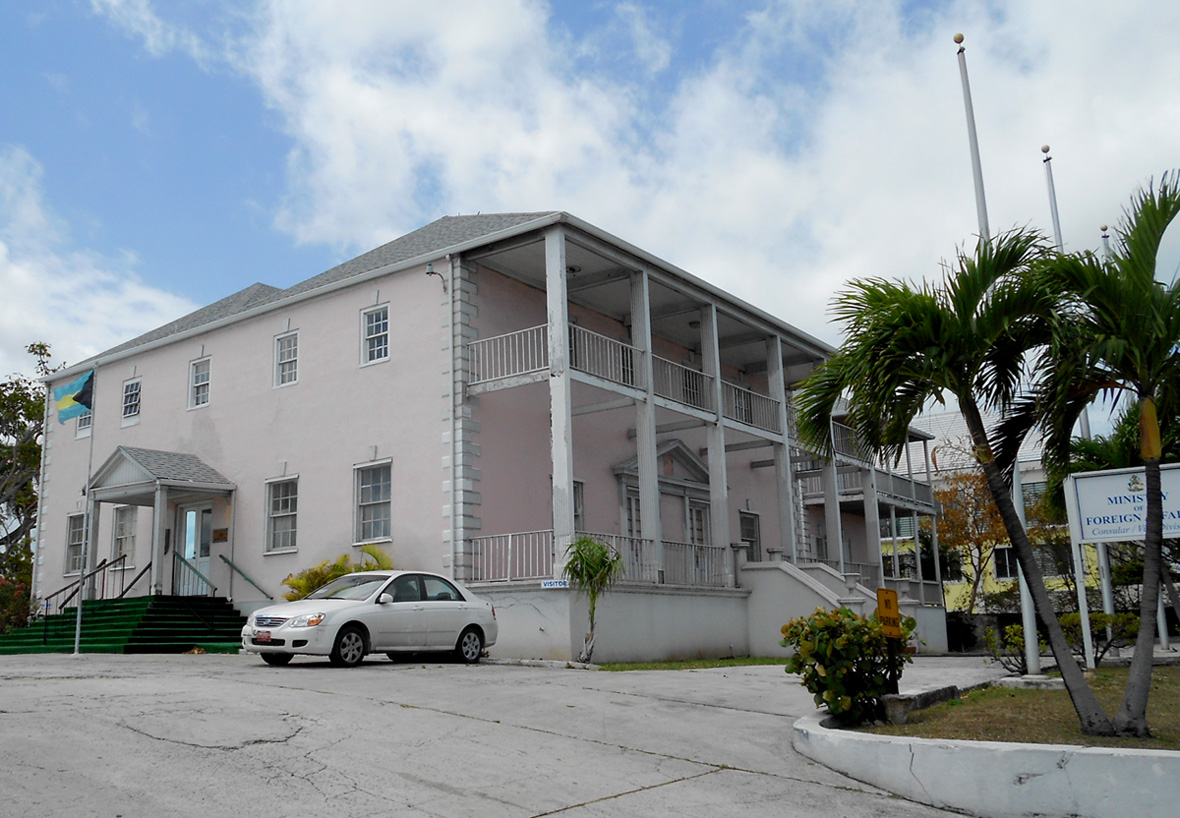
Ministry of Foreign Affairs building in Nassau (2012)

The Ministry of Foreign Affairs is the Bahamas government ministry which oversees the foreign relations of Bahamas. The current foreign affairs minister is the Honourable Fred Mitchell, MP (Member of Parliament) for Fox Hill.

== See also ==
- Minister of Foreign Affairs (Bahamas)
- Foreign relations of the Bahamas
