= Ministry of National Security (The Bahamas) =

Government ministry of the Bahamas

Ministry of National Security of The Bahamas
- Bahamas Ministry of National Security
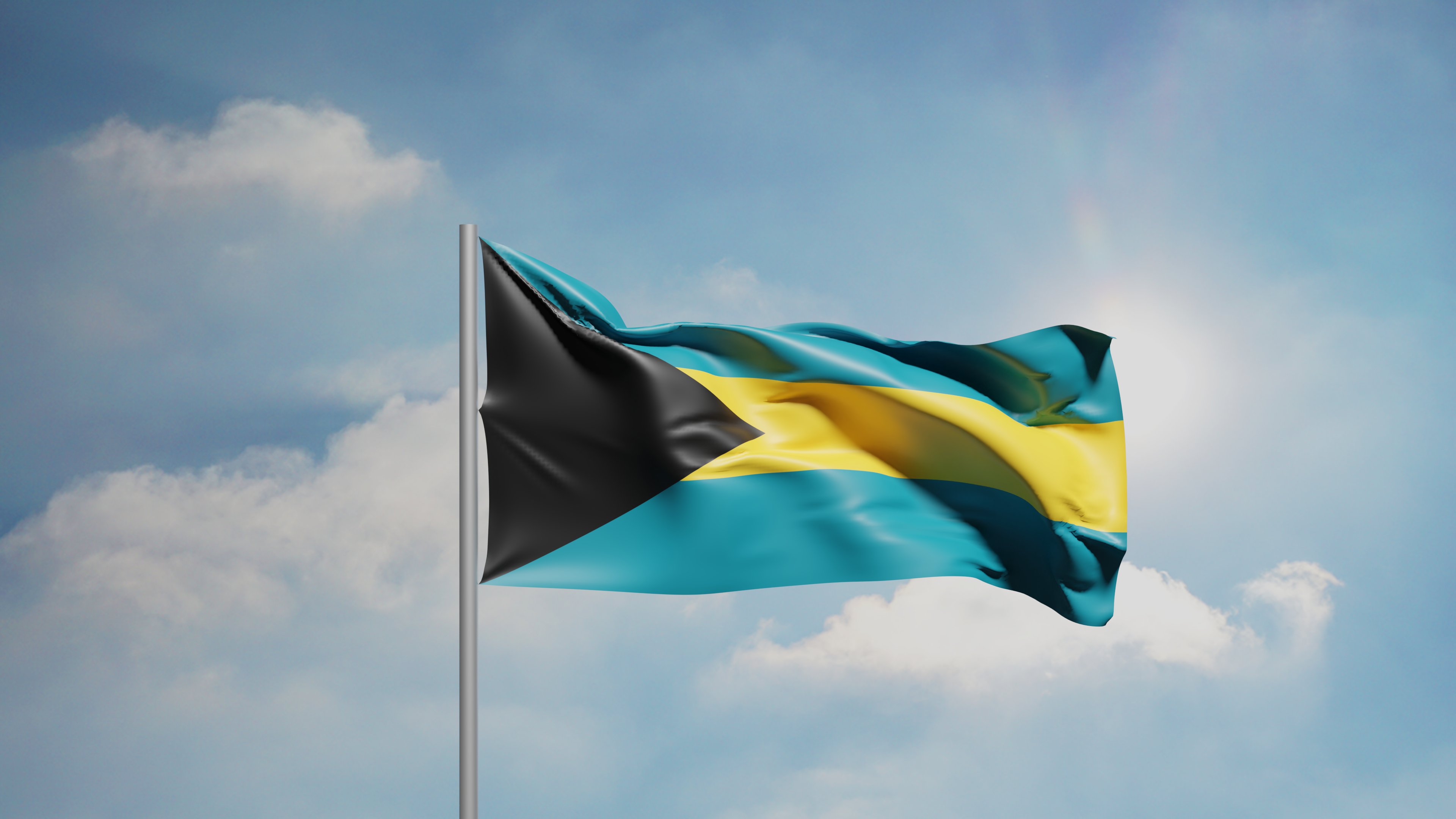

Agency overview
- Formed: 1990
- Preceding agency: Ministry of Home Affairs
- Jurisdiction: Government of The Bahamas
- Headquarters: New Providence, Bahamas
- Website: Ministry of National Security

Ministry of National Security (MNS) is the primary law enforcement and national defense agency within the Commonwealth of the Bahamas. The Ministry of National Security has responsibility for customs and immigration, defense and the national police force. Their mission is to, "defend, protect and guard the national and territorial sovereignty and integrity of The Bahamas and its citizens. Agencies located within the portfolio of the MNS include:

- Royal Bahamas Defence Force
- Royal Bahamas Police Force
- Bahamas Customs Service
- Bahamas Immigration Department
- Bahamas Prison Service

== History ==
=== Formation ===
The Ministry of National Security was established in 1990. Originally, when the country gained independence in 1973 it was first called Ministry of Home Affairs. During 1992 after the General Elections immigration and transportation was added under the Ministry of National Security jurisdiction. In 1998 continuing into 2002, the MNS became the office of the Deputy Prime Minister and The Ministry of National Security. Today, the Ministry of National Security is located on John F. Kennedy Drive, Nassau, New Providence in the Bahamas.

=== Initiatives ===
The MNS oversees organizations such as (CJSP) the Citizen Security and Justice Programme. This program focuses on issues driving crime within the Bahamas. There is the "clear, hol

=== Policies ===
1. Inquiry Agents and Security Guards Act of 1976-
2. Prerogative of Mercy-
3. Holistic Crime Strategy-
4. Investing in the Youth: The Bahamas National Youth Guard.
5. Multi-Agency Financial Conclave-

=== Divisions ===
==== Royal Bahamas Police Force ====
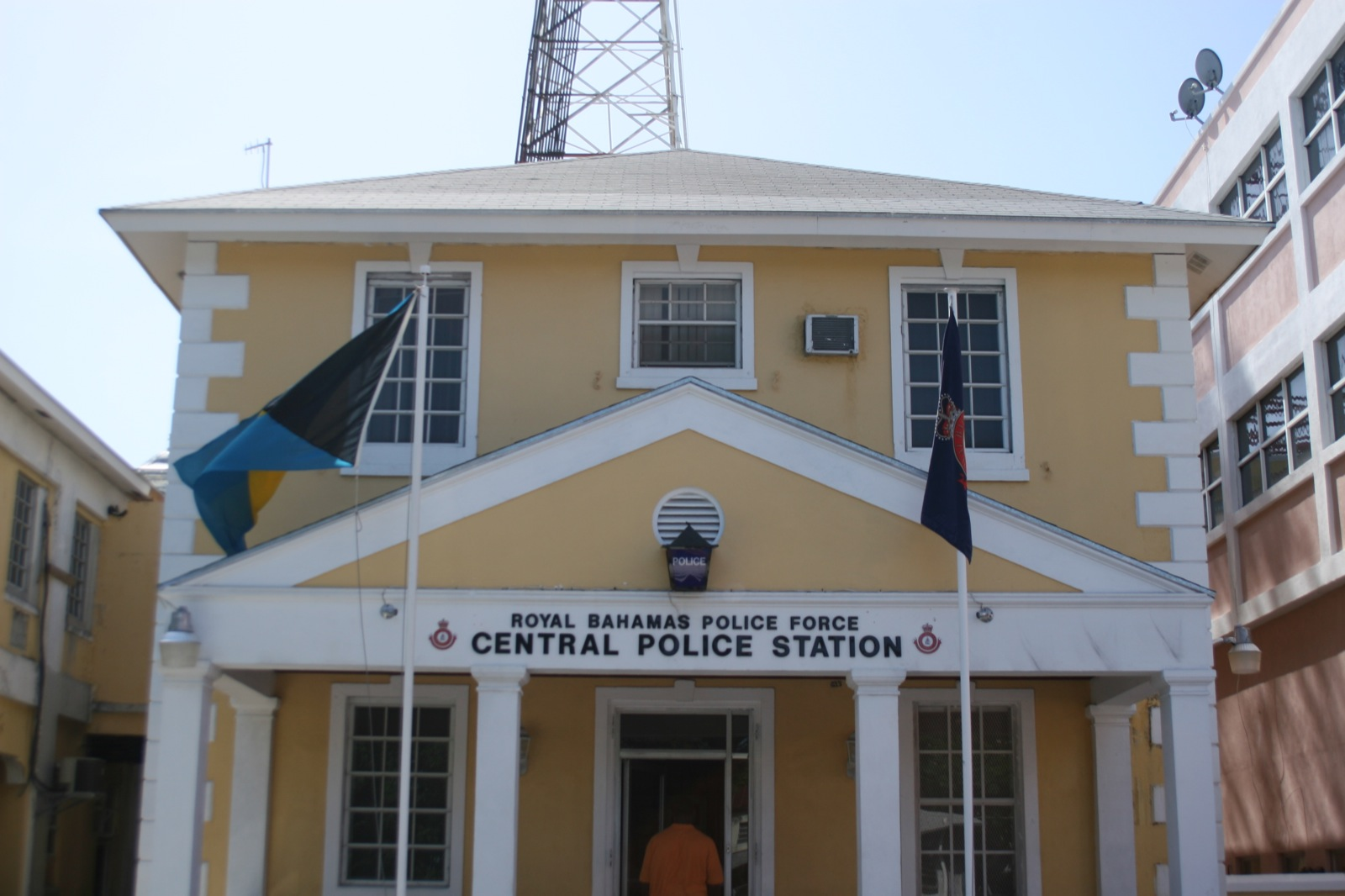
Police HQ

The police force was established on March 1, 1840. Their mission is "working together for a safer Bahamas." The Royal Bahamas Police Force functions are the maintenance of Law & Order, preservation of the peace, prevention and detection of crime, the apprehension of offenders and the enforcement of laws.

==== Royal Bahamas Defense Force ====
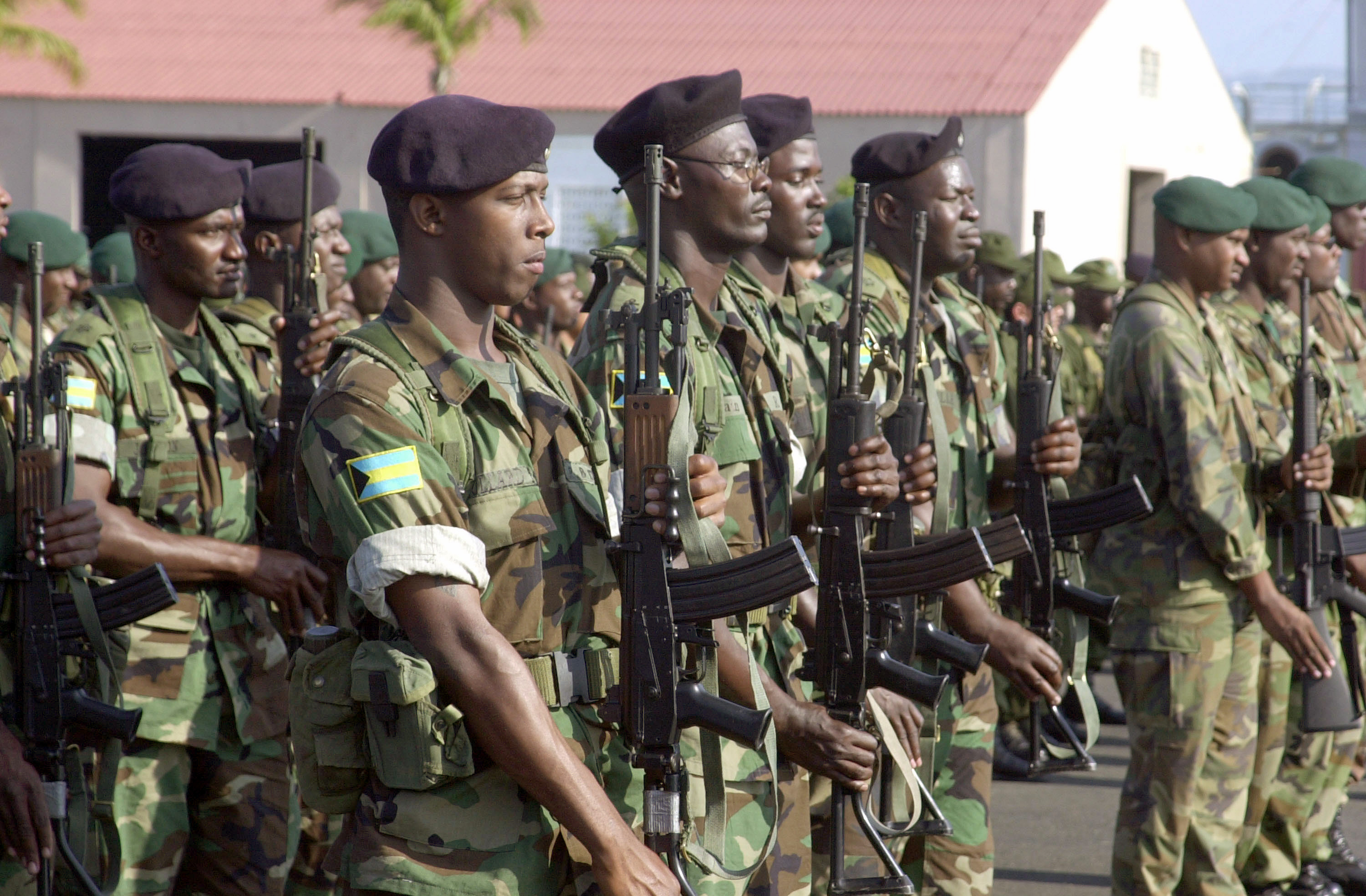
Bahamas Defense Force

The Royal Bahamas Defense Force is the military entity of the Bahamas established March 31, 1980. Their motto is "the pursuit of excellence in guarding our heritage." The Royal Bahamas Defense Force duties are as follows: The defence of the Bahamas, the protection of the territorial integrity of The Bahamas, to patrol of the waters of The Bahamas, to Provide assistance and relief in times of disasters, the maintenance of law and order in conjunction with other law enforcement agencies and lastly any such duties as determined by the National Security Council.

==== Bahamas Department of Corrections ====
Fox Hill Prison
- Interactive map of Fox Hill Prison
- Location: Fox Hill; 25°01′40″N 77°17′31″W
- Opened: March 1952
- Former name: Her Majesty's Prisons
- Managed by: Bahamas Department of Correctional Services

Established when the correctional services act was passed on August 11, 2014. They manage Fox Hill Prison formerly known as he The Bahamas Department of Corrections mission is to contribute to the protection of society by optimizing staff development while maintaining inmates in a controlled, safe, secure, and humane environment that encourages rehabilitation and successful reintegration into society. This department's role is to be responsible for maintaining inmates in a controlled, safe and secure environment whereby contributing to the protection of society.

=== Administrative Staff ===
==== Minister of National Security- ====
Wayne Munroe is the current Minister of National Security. He is the member of parliament (MP) for the Freetown constituency.

==== Primary Administrative leader ====
The acting Permanent Secretary is Miss Bridget Hepburn.The Permanent Secretary embodies the role of the Chief Administrative Officer. The Permanent Secretary acts as an advisor to the Minister of National Security on the ministry's policies, and the Permanent Secretary supervises the Ministry of National Security: human resources, accounting matters, and ensures the daily implementation of the government's programmes and policies.

== Ministers responsible for national security ==
- Anthony Roberts, 1973 – 1974, as Minister of Home Affairs
- Darrell Rolle, 1974 – 1977, as Minister of Home Affairs
- Darrell Rolle, 1977 – 1979, as Minister of Labour and Home Affairs
- Clement T. Maynard, 1979 – 1984, as Minister of Labour and Home Affairs
- Loftus Roker, 1984 – 1987, as Minister of National Security
- Paul Adderley, 1987 – 1992, as Minister of National Security
- Arlington Butler, 1992 – 1993, as Minister of Public Safety and Immigration
- Arlington Butler, 1993 – 1995, as Minister of Public Safety and Transport
- Cornelius A. Smith, 1995 – 1997, as Minister of Public Safety and Immigration
- Frank Watson, 1997 – 2002, as Minister of Public Affairs and Public Enterprise
- Cynthia Pratt, 2002 – 2007, as Minister of National Security
- Orville T. Turnquest, 2007 – 2008, as Minister of National Security and Immigration
- Orville T. Turnquest, 2008 – 2012, as Minister of National Security
- Bernard J. Nottage, 2012 – 2017, as Minister of National Security
- Marvin Dames, 2017 – 2021, as Minister of National Security
- Wayne Munroe, 2021 – Incumbent

== Permanent Secretaries for the Ministry of National Security ==
- Baltron Bethel, 1973 -1983 Ministry of Home Affairs
- Herbert Walkine, 1983-1987 Ministry of Home Affairs
- Mary Sweetnam, 1987 Ministry of Home Affairs
- Wendell Major, 1987-1990 Ministry of Home Affairs
- Mark Wilson, 1992-1995 Ministry of National Security, Public Safety and Immigration
- Idris Reid, 1990-1991 Ministry of National Security
- Wendell Major, 1991-1992 Ministry of National Security, Public Safety and Immigration
- Mark Wilson, 1992-1995 Ministry of National Security, Public Safety and Immigration
- Idris Reid, 1995-1997 Ministry of Public Safety and Immigration
- Idris Reid, 1997-1998 Office of the Deputy Prime Minister, Ministry of National Security and Public Enterprises
- Harcourt Turnquest, 1998-2000 Office of the Deputy Prime Minister and Ministry of National Security
- Mark Wilson, 2000-2007 Office of the Deputy Prime Minister and Ministry of National Security
- Missouri Sherman, 2007-2010 Ministry of National Security
- Carl Smith, 2010-2019 Office of the Prime Minister and Ministry of National Security
- Eugene Poitier, 2021-20222 Ministry of National Security, later assigned to the Ministry of Foreign Affairs
- Cheryl Darville 2022-2025, Ministry of National Security and current Acting Permanent Secretary(2025–Present)
- Bridget E. Hepburn 2025–Present, Ministry of National Security
