= Paulette Bethel =

Bahamian diplomat

Paulette A. Bethel
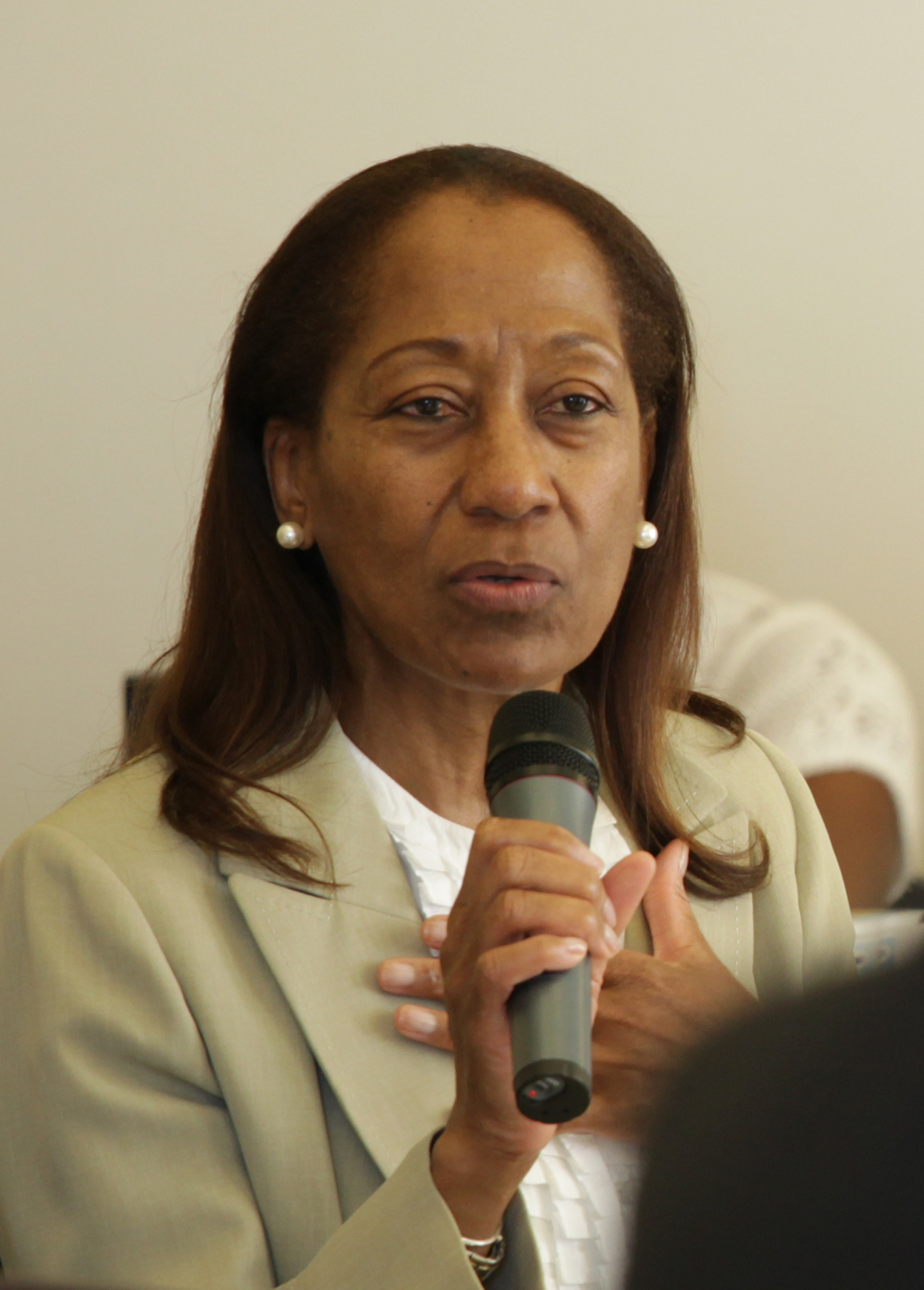
- Paulette Bethel at the United Nations Economic and Social Council Annual Ministerial Review on Education in 2011
- Born: Paulette A. Bethel
- Occupations: International civil servant, diplomat and negotiator
- Known for: Work in UN
- Notable work: Permanent Representative of the Bahamas to the United Nations

Dr. Paulette A. Bethel is a Bahamian diplomat from the Commonwealth of The Bahamas. She started her professional career in 1980 in the international field as Assistant Social Affairs Officer in the Centre for Social Development and Humanitarian Affairs (CSDHA) in Vienna, Austria. She then joined the Ministry of Foreign Affairs (Bahamas) and served in diplomatic posts for long years for her country. She was a Special Adviser to the Office of the President of the Seventieth session of the United Nations General Assembly. She was previously the Permanent Representative of the Bahamas to the United Nations from 4 March 2003 to 31 March 2013. She was the first female Ambassador of The Bahamas to the United Nations. She had also worked as Director of the Department of Fellowships at the Organization of American States (OAS); the first such position for a national of Bahamas.

== Biography ==
Paulette A. Bethel, a Bahamian, obtained Bachelor of Arts (B.A) degree from the University of Toronto and Master of Arts (M.A.) degree from the Howard University. She studied at the University of Massachusetts at Amherst and received her Doctor of Philosophy degree (Ph.D.) in Sociology in 1980. She also studied and obtained Certificate for Creative Processes Facilitation and Certificate for International Negotiations: Practical Skills and Techniques.

On completion of her education, in 1976 Bethel worked as a lecturer in Sociology at the College of The Bahamas. She then became Chairperson of the Department of Social Sciences in the same college during 1977. She started her professional career as a diplomat in Vienna in 1981 with the United Nations as Assistant Social Affairs Officer in the Centre for Social Development and Humanitarian Affairs (CSDHA). She then became a diplomat in the Ministry of Foreign Affairs (Bahamas) and served as Minister Counsellor at the Permanent Mission of The Bahamas to the United Nations. After this she moved to the Embassy of The Bahamas in Washington D.C., in 1988 and concurrently was represented on Organization of American States (OAS). She was the first diplomat to work at level of Director of the Department of Fellowships at the OAS, in 1994. She then returned to Bahamas where she worked with the private sector in the field of international financial and corporate services on issues of risk management and compliance.

In March 2007 she was the "Team Leader" of a Joint Field Visit of the Executive Boards of UNICEF, UNDP, UNFPA, and WFP to Liberia to assess utilization of the UN funds and implementation of programmes during the process of the country's transition from "post-conflict to reconstruction, recovery, and development."

Representing her country as the first woman, she was appointed as Ambassador Extraordinary and Plenipotentiary of Bahamas to the United Nations from 2013; she worked in this capacity up to March 2013. Her long and wide range of services in the UN covered involvement with the issues related to Sustainable Development Goals (SDGs), climate change, budget and management. At the 68th Session of the United Nations General Assembly held in September 2011 she functioned in the capacity of Chef de Cabinet of the Office of the President for that session.
