= Fox Hill (Bahamas Parliament constituency) =

Bahamas parliamentary constituency

- Constituency
- Fox Hill is 11 on this map of the 2021 election
- District: New Providence
- Electorate: 3,947 (2011)

Current constituency
- Seats: 1
- Party: Progressive Liberal Party
- Member: Fred Mitchell

Fox Hill is a parliamentary constituency represented in the House of Assembly of the Bahamas. It elects one member of parliament (MP) using the first past the post electoral system. It has been represented by Minister of Foreign Affairs Fred Mitchell from the Progressive Liberal Party since 2021.

== Geography ==
The constituency is named after the New Providence village of Fox Hill, known for the country's only prison Fox Hill Prison.

== Members of Parliament ==
Election	Parliament	Candidate	Party
1997	9th Bahamian Parliament	Juanianne Dorsett	Free National Movement
2002	10th Bahamian Parliament	Fred Mitchell	Progressive Liberal Party
2007	11th Bahamian Parliament	Fred Mitchell	Progressive Liberal Party
2012	12th Bahamian Parliament	Fred Mitchell	Progressive Liberal Party
2017	13th Bahamian Parliament	Shonel Ferguson	Free National Movement
2021	14th Bahamian Parliament	Fred Mitchell	Progressive Liberal Party
2026	15th Bahamian Parliament	Fred Mitchell	Progressive Liberal Party

== Election results ==
2021
Party	Candidate	Votes	%	±%
PLP	Fred Mitchell	2,712	65.71	▲20.71
FNM	John Pinder	1,030	24.96	▼25.04
COI	Yvette Prince	246	5.96	
DNA	Ricardo Forbes	103	2.50	▼1.50
United Coalition Movement	Karen Cyr	19	0.46	
Grand Commonwealth Party	Michelle Wildgoose	17	0.41	
Turnout		4,127	68.32	
PLP gain from FNM				

== See also ==
- Constituencies of the Bahamas
