= Ivy Dumont =

Bahamian politician (born 1930)

The Most Honourable Dame Ivy Dumont DCMG

7th Governor-General of the Bahamas
- In office 1 January 2002 – 30 November 2005; Acting: 13 November 2001 – 1 January 2002
- Monarch: Elizabeth II
- Prime Minister: Hubert Ingraham; Perry Christie
- Preceded by: Sir Orville Turnquest
- Succeeded by: Paul Adderley (acting)

Personal details
- Born: 2 October 1930 (age 95)
- Spouse: Reginald Dumont (m. 1951; died 2011)

Dame Ivy Leona Dumont (née Turnquest; born 2 October 1930), is a Bahamian politician who served as the seventh governor-general of the Bahamas. She was the first woman in the Bahamas to hold this office, from 1 January 2002 (on an acting basis since 13 November 2001) until 30 November 2005. She previously served as Minister of Education from 1995 to 2001.

== Early life ==
Turnquest was born on 2 October 1930, at Roses on Long Island in the Bahamas. After completing her elementary education in Roses and Buckleys settlements on Long Island, she continued her schooling at the Government High School on New Providence. Attaining her Cambridge Junior Certificate in 1946 and her Cambridge Senior Certificate in 1947, Turnquest graduated in 1948. She furthered her studies at the Bahamas Teachers’ Training College earning her training teaching certificate in 1951. Around this same time, Turnquest married Reginald Dumont (1920 – 17 December 2011) a Guyanese immigrant who was working for the Bahamas Police Force on 24 August 1951. She began working for the Ministry of Education and Culture as a student teacher and earned her full teaching certificate in 1954.

== Career ==
Upon receipt of her credentials, Dumont started her career as a classroom teacher. In 1962 and 1963, she studied in the United States as a Fulbright scholar and then in 1965, earned a General Certificate of Education from the Teachers' Union Institute. From 1968 to 1970, Dumont attended the University of Miami, graduating with her bachelor's degree in education. Appointed as head teacher at that time, Dumont then moving into administration, serving as education officer and as deputy director of education, before completing her education career after 21 years in 1975.

Dumont then began working as the deputy permanent secretary of the Ministry of Works and Utilities in 1975. She continued her own education and enrolled at Nova University in 1976. Dumont graduated with a doctorate in public administration in 1978 and that same year left the Ministry of Works and began working for Roywest Trust Corporation/Nat West International Trust Holdings Limited as a training officer. She remained with Nat West for the next thirteen years, serving as an assistant manager, then personnel manager and group relations manager, before retiring in 1991.

In 1992, Dumont was appointed to the Senate as a representative of the Free National Movement (FNM). Simultaneously, she was promoted to the cabinet by Prime Minister Hubert Ingraham, to serve as Minister of Health and Environment. She held this post until 1995, when she was moved to the Ministry of Education and Training. That ministry and Dumont's post transitioned to the Ministry of Education in 1997. She retired from the cabinet in 2000, but retained her Senate seat. In 2001, when Sir Orville Turnquest resigned as Governor-General to facilitate his son Tommy Turnquest's run for party leadership the following year, Dumont was selected as his interim replacement on 13 November 2001. She was confirmed as the permanent Governor-General on 1 January 2002, becoming the first woman to hold the post. She resigned from the post on 30 November 2005 and the following day was feted with a farewell ceremony commemorating her fifty-eight years in public service.

In 2007, the University of the West Indies conferred an honorary doctor of laws degree upon Dumont. After leaving public service, Dumont wrote her autobiography, Roses to Mount Fitzwilliam and remained active, speaking to public schools and encouraging youth to further their education.

Government offices
Preceded by Orville Turnquest	Governor-General of the Bahamas; 2001–2005	Succeeded by Paul Adderley; Acting
