= Fred Mitchell (politician) =

Bahamian Progressive Liberal Party politician

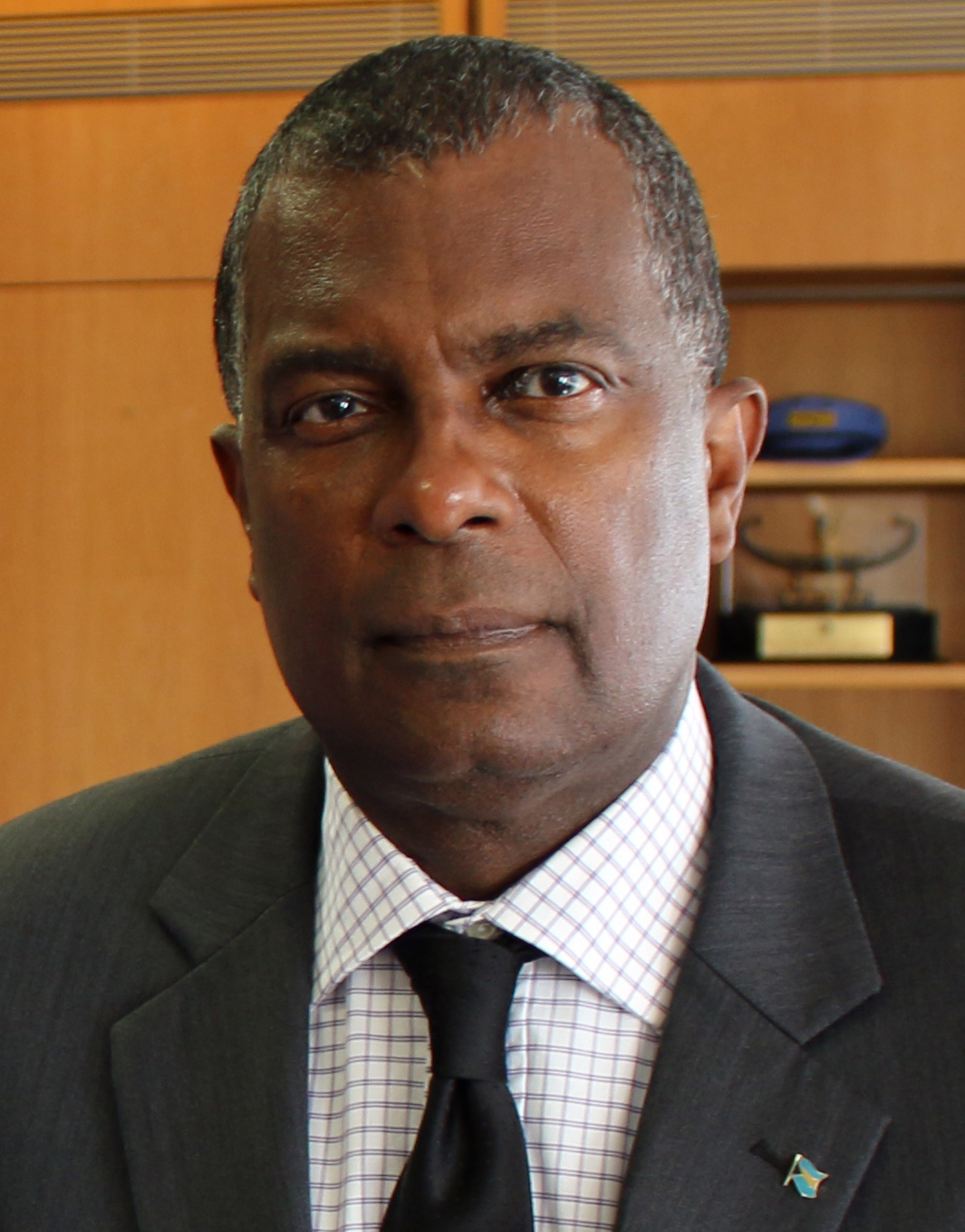
- Mitchell in 2016

Minister of Foreign Affairs and Public Service
- Incumbent
- Assumed office 20 September 2021
- Prime Minister: Philip Davis
- Preceded by: Darren Henfield
- In office May 2012 – May 2017
- Prime Minister: Perry Christie
- Preceded by: Brent Symonette
- Succeeded by: Darren Henfield
- In office 2002–2007
- Preceded by: Janet Bostwick
- Succeeded by: Brent Symonette

Member of Parliament for Fox Hill
- Incumbent
- Assumed office September 2021
- Preceded by: Shonel Ferguson
- In office 2002 – May 2017
- Preceded by: Juanianne Dorsett

Senator
- In office 2017–2021
- In office 1992–1997

Personal details
- Born: 5 October 1953 (age 72) Nassau, Bahamas
- Party: Progressive Liberal Party (1997–present)
- Other political affiliations: Independent (1992–1997)
- Education: Antioch University; Harvard University; University of Buckingham

Frederick Audley Mitchell Jr. (born 5 October 1953) is a Bahamian Progressive Liberal Party politician serving as the Minister of Foreign Affairs for the forth time 2002, 2012, 2021 & 2026. He is the Member of Parliament (MP) for Fox Hill, first elected in 2002, 2007, 2012, 2021 and then again in 2026. He also served two terms in the Senate in 1992 and 2017.

== Early life and education ==
Mitchell was born in Nassau, the eldest son of Lilla (née Forde) and Frederick A. Mitchell Sr. His maternal grandfather was Barbadian. He attended Eastern Junior School, Sands School, and St. Augustine's College. He received his communications degree at Antioch University, his master's at Harvard University, and his law degree at the University of Buckingham.

== Career ==
Mitchell was called to both the Bar of England and Wales and the Bar of the Bahamas. He worked in broadcasting and journalism.

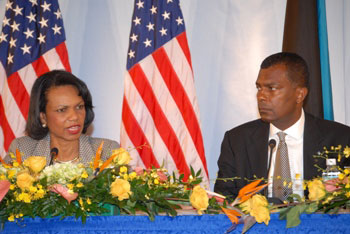
Mitchell with Condoleezza Rice in 2006

Mitchell began his political career as a senator appointed by Free National Movement Prime Minister Hubert Ingraham in 1992. In the Senate, he was chairman of the Select Committee on Culture. He joined the Progressive Liberal Party and ran for the Fox Hill constituency in the 1997 general election. He tried again in 2002 and was elected to the Assembly.

He worked as editor of The Herald, a paper of the PLP and had a column in The Bahamas Uncensored. Mitchell served as Minister of Foreign Affairs in both Perry Christie governments. He chaired the CARICOM Council for Foreign and Community Relations and supported Haiti becoming a member state. He was a founding member of the Bahamas Committee on Southern Africa.

Mitchell lost his seat in the 2017 general election. Whilst out of the Assembly, he returned to the Senate as an opposition leader and PLP chairman. He regained Fox Hill in 2021 and was sworn back into his Foreign Minister post under Philip Davis.

== Views and public image ==
During his time in politics, some of his peers have accused him of "catching feelings" and being "overly emotional". Mitchell has also come under criticism from socially conservative Bahamians for his support of LGBT+ rights. However he believes that he will be remembered like Nelson Mandela for his stance. Although his party had no official policy regarding the monarchy until 2022, he was personally against it prior to that.

== See also ==
- List of foreign ministers in 2017
- List of current foreign ministers
