= Juanianne Dorsett =

Bahamian politician

Member of the Parliament of the Bahamas for Fox Hill
- In office 1997–2002
- Succeeded by: Fred Mitchell

Personal details
- Party: Free National Movement

Juanianne Dorsett is a Bahamian politician from the Free National Movement.

== Career ==
She was MP for Fox Hill from 1997 to 2002. In 2019, she was appointed to the senate. In 2019, she was elected vice-president of the senate.
