= National Development Party (Bahamas) =

The National Development Party (NDP) was an early 21st century political party in the Bahamas that existed between 2008 and about 2011.

== Party formation ==
The National Development Party (NDP) arose out of a series of meetings between Mr. B. J. Moss and Dr. Andre Rollins in September 2008.

Both men were motivated to form a new political party due to a belief that there was no clear vision or plan for the development of the Bahamas being articulated by either of the established political parties, the Progressive Liberal Party (PLP) and the Free National Movement (FNM), and that many of the problems besetting the nation and its impending growth, was due to an emphasis on partisan politics rather than nation building.

The precepts of the party, therefore, centred on nation building, and inspired the naming of the party, the National Development Party.

The party was registered in October 2008. A decision was made to form an executive steering committee to guide the development of the party and to ensure a focus on political ideology rather than political idolatry or cult of personality. Open house meetings began in early 2009 and the steering committee was established shortly afterwards. The party then elected Dr. Andre Rollins to be the chairperson in October 2009. In August 2010, the party elected Mr. Renward Wells as chair of the executive steering committee. Wells led the executive steering committee until November 2010 when the party held its first national convention. At the national convention, Wells was elected the party's first leader and Lindon Nairn the party's first deputy leader.

== 2010 Elizabeth By-Election ==
On January 13, 2010, the NDP announced its intention to run by-election in the Elizabeth constituency, following the resignation of former Elizabeth MP Malcom Adderley.

In the press release, Rollins stated that the NDP would become the first party in the history of Bahamian politics to hold a primary and debate the selection of its candidate. This primary and debate took place at the Joe Farrington Road Auditorium on January 27, 2010, and Dr. Rollins was chosen as the candidate.

On election day, February 16, 2010, Rollins received 72 votes.

== Decline ==
The party became defunct in 2011 when Wells and Rollins joined the PLP.
