= Orville Turnquest =

Bahamian politician (born 1929)

The Most Honourable Sir Orville Turnquest GCMG KC JP
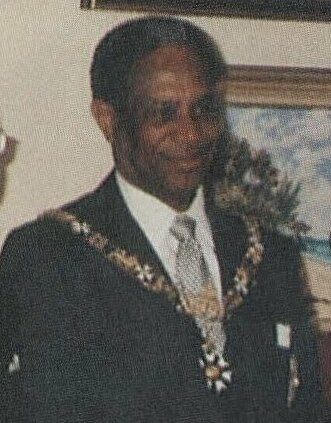
- Turnquest in 1997

6th Governor-General of the Bahamas
- In office 3 January 1995 – 13 November 2001
- Monarch: Elizabeth II
- Prime Minister: Hubert Ingraham
- Preceded by: Sir Clifford Darling
- Succeeded by: Dame Ivy Dumont

Deputy Prime Minister of the Bahamas
- In office 1992–1995
- Prime Minister: Hubert Ingraham
- Preceded by: Clement T. Maynard
- Succeeded by: Frank Watson

Foreign Minister of The Bahamas
- In office 21 August 1992 – 3 January 1995
- Prime Minister: Hubert Ingraham
- Preceded by: Clement T. Maynard
- Succeeded by: Janet Bostwick

Personal details
- Born: Orville Alton Turnquest; 19 July 1929 (age 97) Grants Town, New Providence, The Bahamas
- Party: Free National Movement
- Education: University of London

Sir Orville Alton Turnquest (born 19 July 1929) is a Bahamian politician who was the Deputy Prime Minister and Minister of External Relations of the Bahamas from 1992 to 1994, and the sixth governor-general of the Bahamas from 3 January 1995 until his retirement on 13 November 2001.

== Biography ==
Turnquest was born in Grants Town, New Providence, to Robert and Gwendolyn Turnquest. After obtaining his Cambridge Junior Certificate, Cambridge Senior Certificate and London Matriculation Certificate at the Government High School between 1942 and 1945, he was articled in the law chambers of the late Hon. A. F. Adderley from 1947 to 1953, being called to The Bahamas Bar on 26 June 1953. He subsequently studied at the University of London (1957–60), earning a bachelor of laws degree (LLB) with honours, and in July 1960 was admitted to the English Bar as a member of Lincoln's Inn.

He served as Bahamian Attorney-General and Minister of Justice and Foreign Affairs from 21 August 1992, and became Deputy Prime Minister, Attorney-General and Minister of Foreign Affairs on 1 September 1993. He served until 1995. He was knighted in 1995.

== Honours ==
- United Kingdom:
  - Knight Grand Cross of the Order of St Michael and St George (GCMG) (1995)
- Bahamas:
  - Member of the Order of the Nation (ON) (2018)

Government offices
Preceded by Sir Clifford Darling	Governor-General of the Bahamas; 1995–2001	Succeeded by Dame Ivy Dumont
