= Minister of Foreign Affairs (The Bahamas) =

Minister of Foreign Affairs of Bahamas
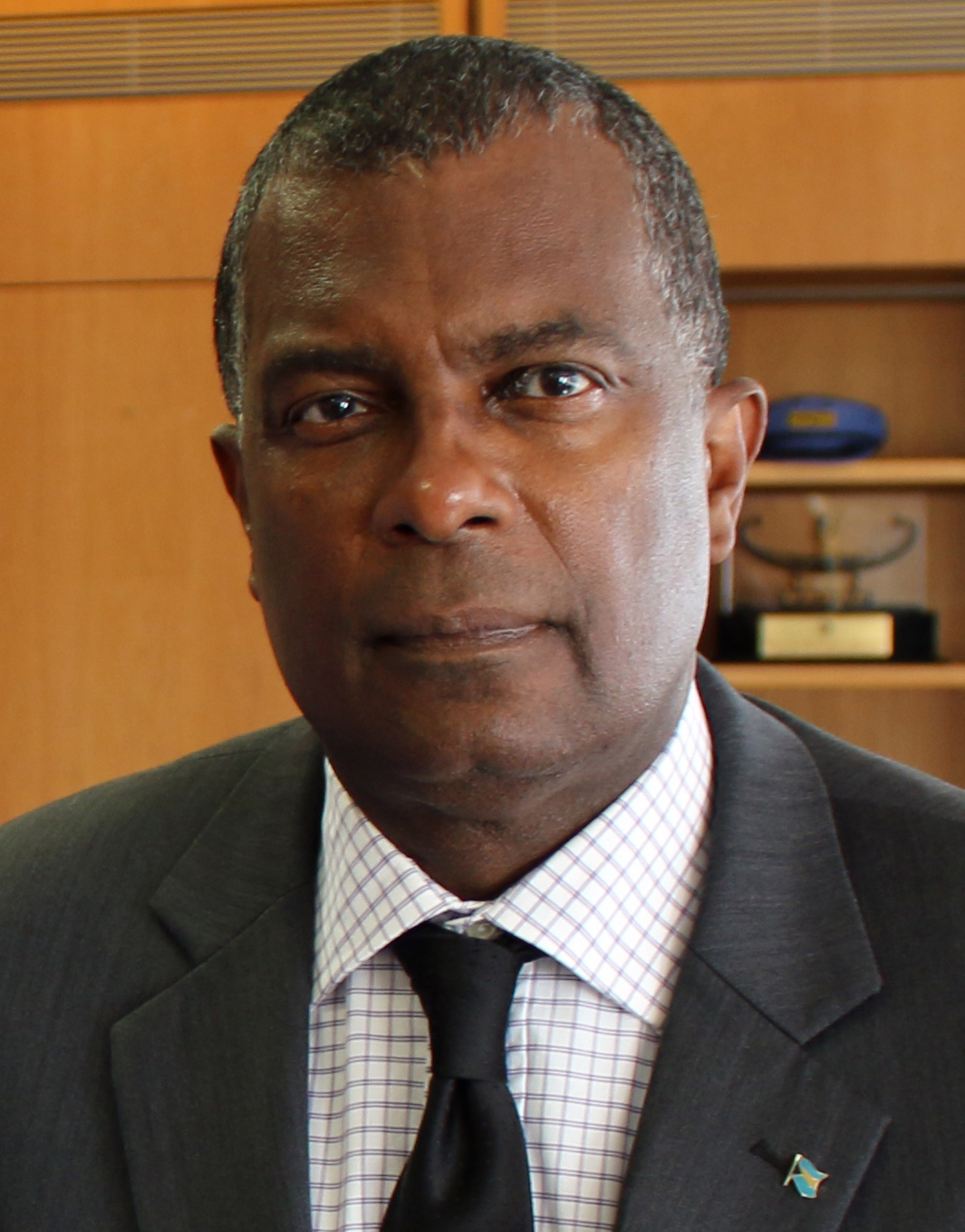
- Incumbent; Fred Mitchell since 20 September 2021
- Ministry of Foreign Affairs
- Type: Minister
- Formation: 1973
- First holder: Paul Adderley

The minister of foreign affairs is the primary government officer in the Commonwealth of the Bahamas mandated to control foreign missions of the country. He is the head of the Ministry of Foreign Affairs. He has the responsibility of implementing the Bahamian government's foreign affairs priorities. The current foreign affairs minister is The Honorable Fred Mitchell.

== List of ministers ==
This is a list of ministers of foreign affairs of the Bahamas:

- 1973–1984: Paul Adderley
- 1984–1989: Clement T. Maynard
- 1989–1990: Charles Carter
- 1990–1992: Sir Clement T. Maynard
- 1992–1994: Orville Turnquest
- 1994–2002: Janet Bostwick
- 2002–2007: Fred Mitchell
- 2007–2012: Brent Symonette
- 2012–2017: Fred Mitchell
- 2017–2021: Darren Henfield
- 2021–present: Fred Mitchell
