= Royal Bahamas Police Force =

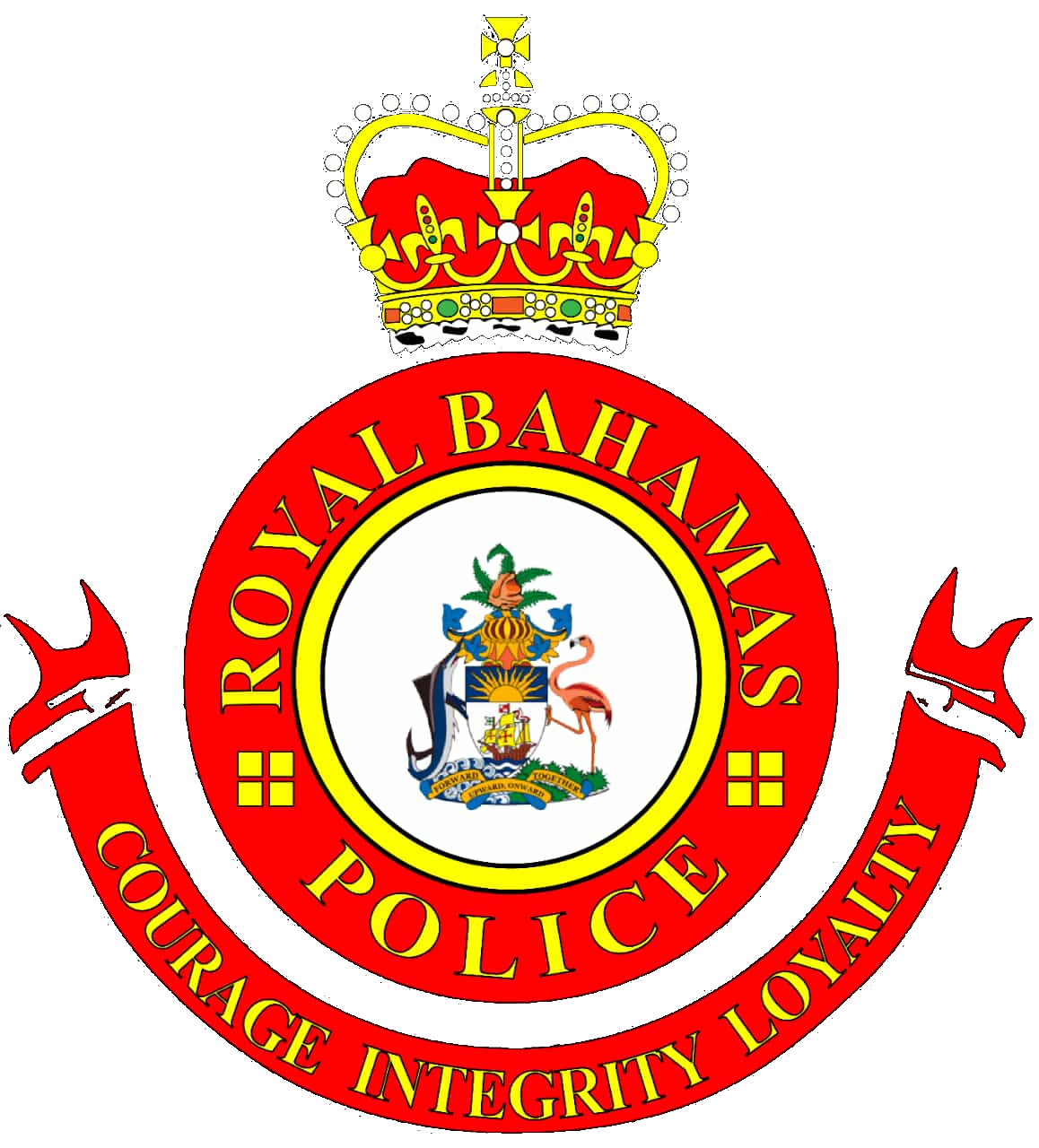
- Crest of the Royal Bahamas Police Force

Agency overview
- Formed: 1 March 1840

Jurisdictional structure
- Operations jurisdiction: Bahamas
- General nature: Civilian police

Operational structure
- Agency executive: Shanta E. Knowles, Commissioner of Police

Website
- royalbahamaspolice.org

The Royal Bahamas Police Force (RBPF) is the national law enforcement agency of the Commonwealth of the Bahamas. It operates within the portfolio of the Ministry of National Security. The police force was established on 1 March 1840 and is headquartered on East Street Hill in Nassau, Bahamas.

== History ==
The Bahamas was originally settled by the Lucayan people before they were depopulated by Spanish slave raids in the 16th century; the islands were subsequently colonised by English settlers over the course of the 17th century, beginning with Independent Parliamentarians driven out of Bermuda as the Eleutheran Adventurers during the Civil War. In 1718, the Bahamas became a crown colony of the Kingdom of Great Britain after the British clamped down on piracy in the Caribbean.

During the eighteenth and early nineteenth centuries, the development of policing in the Bahamas followed patterns in Britain. Law enforcement personnel consisted of constables, who assisted in enforcing government rules and regulations and apprehended offenders, and night watchmen, who patrolled the streets of Bahamian settlements at nighttime. The town of Nassau had a night watch and, as early as 1729, a constable existed in New Providence, where he worked in concert with the settlement's magistrate, justices of the peace and several other government officials.

In 1799, the Bahamas General Assembly passed an act which declared that all constables would have the same powers as their counterparts in Great Britain, which included the right to arrest an individual on the basis of reasonable suspicion. In 1827, the General Assembly passed another act which clarified the mode of appointment for constables. During this period, only one constable was appointed to serve in each district. These appointments were made by the incumbent magistrate in each district with the assistance of two justices of the peace. As time passed and crime increased, the constables appointed to serve at the same time increased; however, they were never organised into a formal police force. Each constable reported to the magistrate of a particular district. This system eventually evolved into the currently used positions of district and local constables. In 1833, the Parliament of the United Kingdom passed the Slavery Abolition Act 1833, which abolished slavery in most of the British Empire; this eventually led to the dissolution of the night watch in New Providence.

On 1 March 1840, the Bahamas Police Force (BPF) was formed by sixteen men under the command of Inspector-General John Pinder. Many of these men were former members of the night watch and, with the exception of Pinder, they were all formerly enslaved. The BPF, like the Metropolitan Police which preceded it, was intended to provide a non-military alternative to suppressing disorder, and operated an around-the-clock service in New Providence. Several years later, a number of BPF officers were transferred to other islands in the Bahamas. By December 1840, the BPF's strength consisted of one inspector-general and a total of thirty sergeants, corporals and privates (the latter rank holding the same position as constables). The BPF was eventually granted the prefix "Royal" by the Crown. In the 21st century, the RBPF has over 4,000 officers and civilian employees and provides policing services to all residents and visitors in the Bahamas.

== Commissioners of Police ==
This is an incomplete list of Commissioners of Police:

| Name | Terms |
|---|---|
| Edward Dewitt Sears | 1954–1955 |
| Lt. Col. E. J. H. Colchester-Wemyss, OBE | 1955–1963 |
| Col. Nigel G. Morris, CBE | 1963–unknown |
| John H. Hinmarsh | unknown–1973 |
| Salathiel Thompson | 1973–1981 |
| Gerald A. Bartlett | 1981–1987 |
| B. K. Bonamy | 1987–2001 |
| Paul H. Farquharson | 2001–2009 |
| Reginald Ferguson | 2009–2010 |
| Ellison E. Greenslade | 2010–2017 |
| Anthony J. Ferguson | 2017–2020 |
| Paul A. Rolle | 2020–2022 |
| Clayton L. Fernander | 2022–2025 |
| Shanta E. Knowles | 2025–present |

== Current structure ==
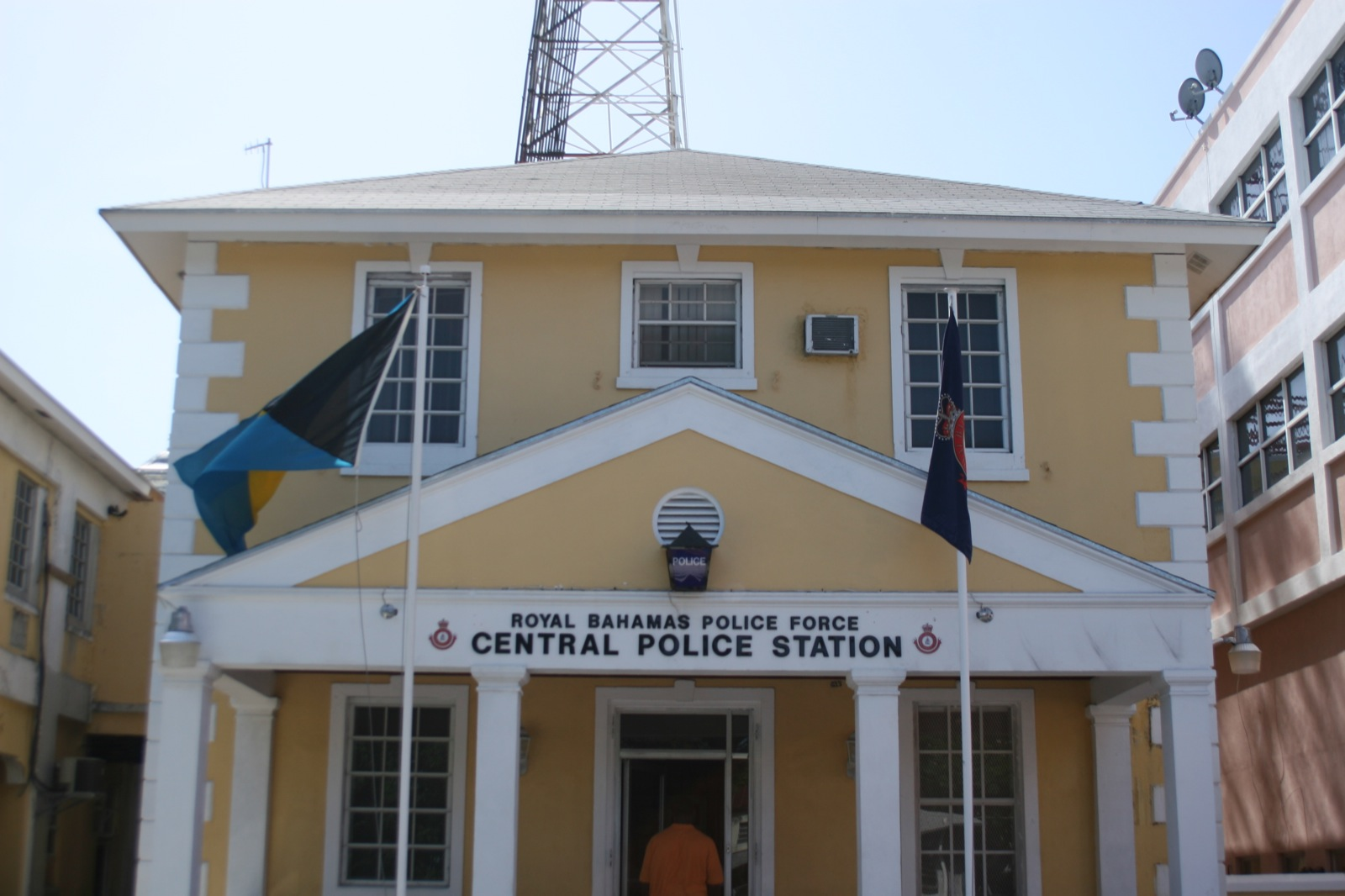
The Central Police Station of the Royal Bahamas Police Force in Nassau

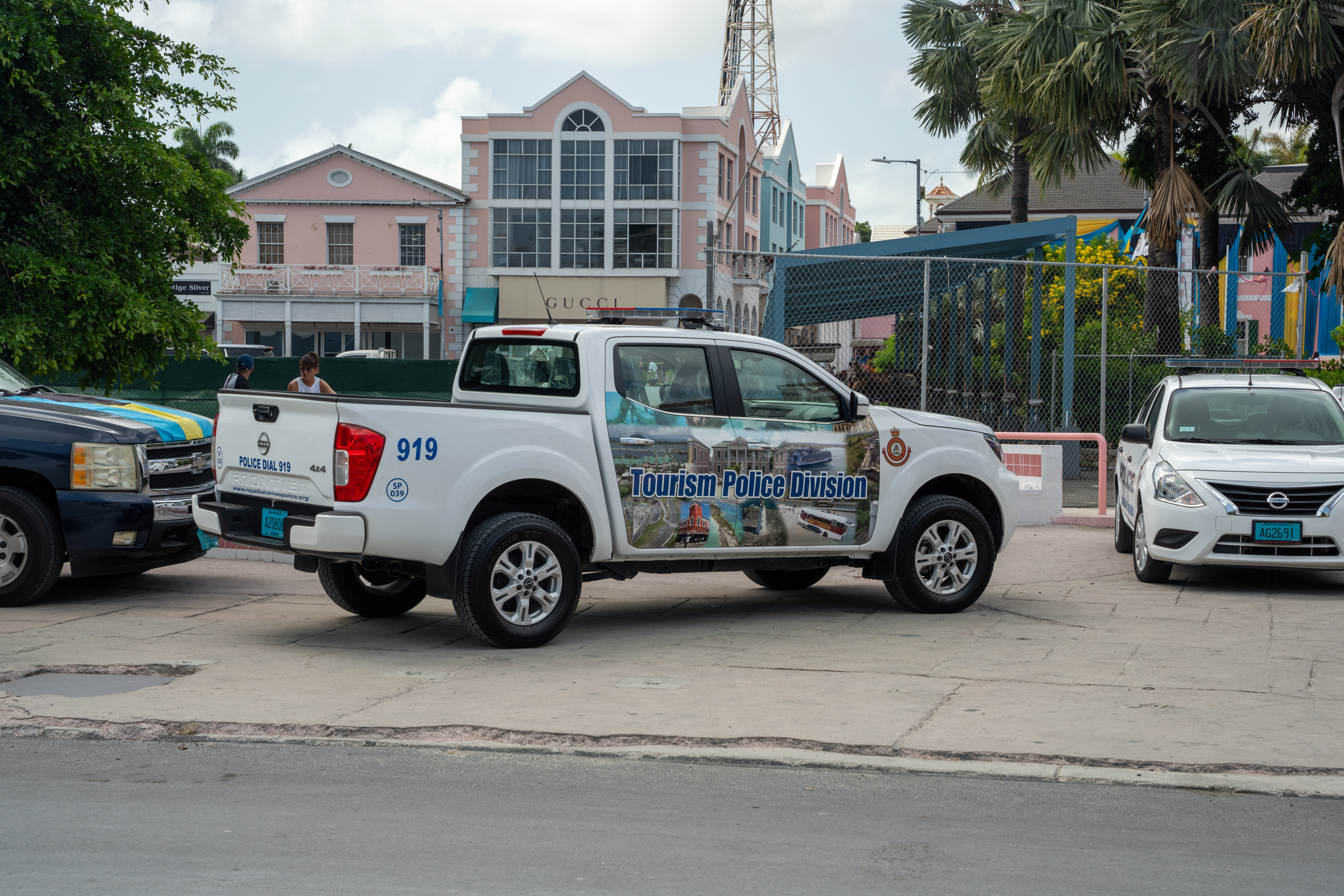
Tourism Police Division pickup truck in 2023

The Royal Bahamas Police Force is headed by the Commissioner of Police, Shanta Knowles, who is supported in her role by two deputy commissioners, three senior assistant commissioners and seven assistant commissioners. The Commissioner of Police has command, direction and control of the Force and is the ex-officio Provost Marshal. The headquarters of the police force is located in Nassau.

The rank structure is similar to that of the United Kingdom's Scotland Yard usage: constable, corporal, sergeant, inspector, assistant superintendent, superintendent, chief superintendent, assistant commissioner, deputy commissioner, and commissioner. There are just over 3,000 members on the force.

=== Senior Executive Leadership Team ===
The Royal Bahamas Police Force is headed by what is known as the Senior Executive Leadership Team (SELT). These officers (ranging from the rank of assistant commissioner to commissioner) are responsible for setting strategic objectives and policies, policing plans, development, and mobilisation of the force.

The Senior Executive Leadership Team consists of the Commissioner (COP), two (2) Deputy Commissioners (DCPs), three (3) Senior Assistant Commissioners (Sr. ACPs) and seven (7) Assistant Commissioners (ACPs). They are:

- Ms. Shanta Knowles, OM - Commissioner of Police
- Mr. Kirkwood Andrews, OM, MSc, BS - Deputy Commissioner of Police (Corporate Services & Discipline)
- Mr. Anthony Rolle, OM, BA - Deputy Commissioner of Police (Urban Renewal & Police Reserves)
- Mr. Zhivago Dames, OM, MBA, BS - Senior Assistant Commissioner of Police (Information & Communications Technology)
- Mr. Roberto Goodman, OM - Senior Assistant Commissioner of Police (Drug Enforcement & Special Operations)
- Mr. Dwight Adderley, OM, MPP - Senior Assistant Commissioner of Police (Security, Intelligence & Border Control)
- Mr. Earl Thompson, OM, BSc - Assistant Commissioner of Police (Scientific Support & Criminal Records)
- Dr. Rodger Thompson OM - Assistant Commissioner of Police (Legal Affairs)
- Mrs. Janet McKenzie, OM, MSc - Assistant Commissioner of Police (Human Resources)
- Dr. Chaswell Hanna, OM - Assistant Commissioner of Police (Public Safety & School Policing)
- Mr. Mareno Hinds - Assistant Commissioner of Police (Training, Support Services & Family Islands District)
- Mr. Anton Rahming - Assistant Commissioner of Police (Crime Management and Criminal Investigations)
- Mr. Advardo Dames - Assistant Commissioner of Police (Northern Bahamas District)

== Activities ==
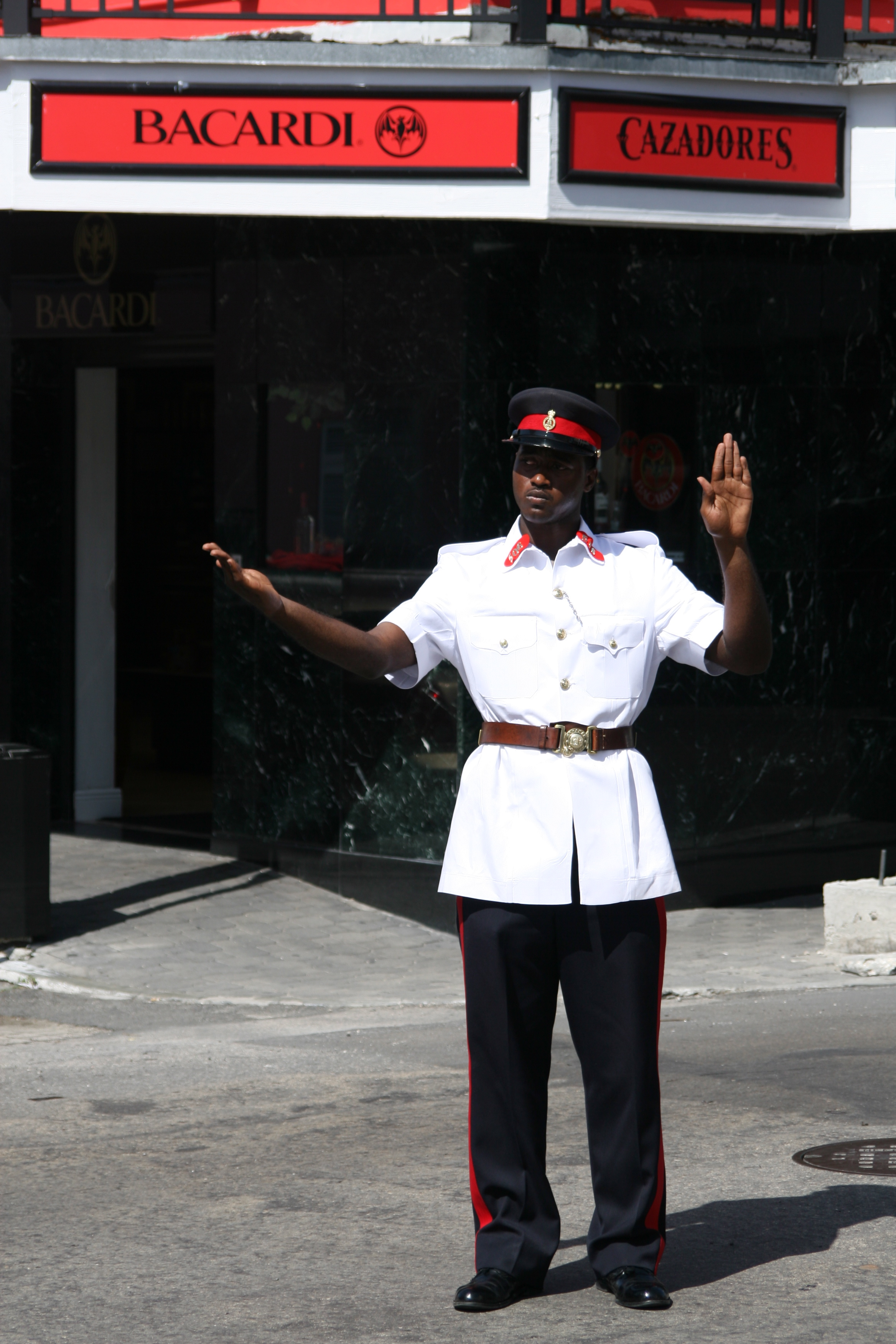
Officer of the Royal Bahamas Police Force

=== Interpol ===
The RBPF became a member of Interpol in October 1973 with the then Commissioner of Police, Salathiel Thompson, becoming the head of Interpol's National Central Bureau in the Bahamas.

=== Operation Rapid Strike ===
Operation Rapid Strike is a project launched on 19 January 2011 at 5:00 pm by Commissioner Ellison Greenslade of the Royal Bahamas Police Force. The mandate of this operation is to "restore peace and civility to our communities". The stated aims of the project is to hunt persons involved in an array of crimes including murder, armed robberies, stabbings, break-ins, firearms related charges, etc. The operation is led by senior ranking officers such as superintendents. Other ranks inside the operation include inspectors, supervisory officers and junior officers. Some equipment used by the members of the operation include two thirty-two seat buses provided by the Government of the Bahamas.

=== Drug Enforcement Unit ===
The Drug Enforcement Unit (DEU) is a branch of the Royal Bahamas Police Force (RBPF) entrusted with the enforcement of drug laws within the Bahamas and investigating all reports into the RBPF about drug trafficking. The DEU was formed in 1988 and has inside units such as the counter-narcotics strike force. The unit is well known for conducting operations to rid agencies like the Royal Bahamas Defence Force and the RBPF of corruption.

It has conducted numerous operations with the American Drug Enforcement Administration.

== See also ==
- Royal Bahamas Defence Force
- Fox Hill Prison
- Government of The Bahamas
