= Bahamas Customs Service =

Bahamas Customs & Excise Department
Agency overview
- Formed: 21 March 1914
- Agency executive: Dr. Geannine Moss, Comptroller
- Website: https://www.bahamascustoms.gov.bs/

Bahamas Customs & Excise Department is the agency of the Bahamian government responsible for collecting revenue and taxes. It was established on March 21, 1914, by an act of the Bahamian Legislature known as an Act to provide for the establishment of a Customs Department. About 55% to 60% of revenue collected in the Bahamas is collected by the agency. Its headquarters is located at Customs House on Thompson Boulevard in Nassau, Bahamas. BCS is housed under the portfolio of the Bahamas Ministry of Finance. The current Comptroller of Customs is Dr. Geannine Moss.
