= List of heads of state of the Bahamas =

Overview of the heads of state of The Bahamas

This is a list of the heads of state of The Bahamas, from the independence of The Bahamas in 1973 to the present day.

From 1973 the head of state under the Bahamas Independence Act 1973 is the Monarch of The Bahamas, currently King Charles III, who is also the Monarch of the United Kingdom and the other Commonwealth realms. The King is represented in The Bahamas by a Governor-General.

== Monarch (1973–present) ==
The succession to the throne is the same as the succession to the British throne.

No.	Portrait	Monarch (Birth–Death)	Reign			Royal House	Prime Minister
No.	Portrait	Monarch (Birth–Death)	Reign start	Reign end	Duration	Royal House	Prime Minister
1		Queen Elizabeth (1926–2022)	10 July 1973	8 September 2022	49 years, 60 days	Windsor	Pindling; Ingraham; Christie; Ingraham; Christie; Minnis; Davis
2		King Charles (born 1948)	8 September 2022	Incumbent	3 years, 201 days	Windsor	Davis

=== Governor-General ===
The Governor-General is the representative of the Monarch in the Bahamas and exercises most of the powers of the Monarch. The Governor-General is appointed for an indefinite term, serving at the pleasure of the Monarch. After the passage of the Statute of Westminster 1931, the Governor-General is appointed solely on the advice of the Cabinet of the Bahamas without the involvement of the British government. In the event of a vacancy the Chief Justice served as Officer Administering the Government.

Symbols

^† Died in office.

Denotes Acting Governor-General

No.	Portrait	Name (Birth–Death)	Term of office			Monarch
No.	Portrait	Name (Birth–Death)	Took office	Left office	Time in office	Monarch
1		Sir John Paul (1916–2004)	10 July 1973	31 July 1973	21 days	Elizabeth II
2		Sir Milo Butler (1906–1979)	1 August 1973	22 January 1979^{[†]}	5 years, 174 days	Elizabeth II
–		Sir Gerald Cash (1917–2003)	22 January 1979	23 September 1979	244 days	Elizabeth II
3		Sir Gerald Cash (1917–2003)	23 September 1979	25 June 1988	8 years, 276 days	Elizabeth II
–		Sir Henry Milton Taylor (1903–1994)	26 June 1988	28 February 1991	2 years, 247 days	Elizabeth II
4		Sir Henry Milton Taylor (1903–1994)	28 February 1991	1 January 1992	307 days	Elizabeth II
5		Sir Clifford Darling (1922–2011)	2 January 1992	2 January 1995	3 years, 0 days	Elizabeth II
6		Sir Orville Turnquest (b. 1929)	3 January 1995	13 November 2001	6 years, 314 days	Elizabeth II
–		Dame Ivy Dumont (b. 1930)	13 November 2001	1 January 2002	49 days	Elizabeth II
7		Dame Ivy Dumont (b. 1930)	1 January 2002	30 November 2005	3 years, 333 days	Elizabeth II
–		Paul Adderley (1928–2012)	1 December 2005	1 February 2006	62 days	Elizabeth II
8		Arthur Dion Hanna (1928–2021)	1 February 2006	14 April 2010	4 years, 72 days	Elizabeth II
9		Sir Arthur Foulkes (b. 1928)	14 April 2010	8 July 2014	4 years, 85 days	Elizabeth II
10		Dame Marguerite Pindling (b. 1932)	8 July 2014	28 June 2019	4 years, 355 days	Elizabeth II
11		Sir Cornelius A. Smith (b. 1937)	28 June 2019	31 August 2023	4 years, 64 days	Elizabeth II; Charles III
12		Dame Cynthia A. Pratt (b. 1945)	31 August 2023	Incumbent	2 years, 209 days	Charles III

== Standards ==
Governor-General's Standard
