= Cat Island, Rum Cay & San Salvador =

Constituency in the Bahamas

Coordinates: 24°27′N 75°30′W

- Constituency
- Region: Family Islands (Out Islands)

Current constituency
- Seats: 1
- Party: Progressive Liberal Party
- Member: Philip Davis
- Created from: Cat Island; Rum Cay & San Salvador; North Long Island, Rum Cay & San Salvador

Cat Island, Rum Cay and San Salvador is a parliamentary constituency represented in the House of Assembly of the Bahamas. It elects one Member of Parliament using the first-past-the-post voting method. The Incumbent Member of Parliament is Philip Davis, who serves as Prime Minister of the Bahamas and Leader of the Progressive Liberal Party (PLP).

== Members of Parliament ==
Election	Candidate	Party	Notes
1992	Philip Davis	PLP	
1997	James Miller	FNM	
2002	Philip Davis	PLP	
2007	Philip Davis	PLP	
2012	Philip Davis	PLP	
2017	Philip Davis	PLP	
2021	Philip Davis	PLP	
2026	Philip Davis	PLP	

== Electoral history ==
General Election 2021: Cat Island, Rum Cay & San Salvador
Party	Candidate	Votes	%	±%
PLP	Philip Davis	876	69.80	▲9.46
FNM	Felicia Knowles	359	28.61	▼10.20
COI	Angelino Cooper	20	1.59	New
Turnout		1,255	74.75	
Registered electors		1,679		

General Election 2017: Cat Island, Rum Cay & San Salvador
Party	Candidate	Votes	%	±%
PLP	Philip Davis	852	60.34	▲7.77
FNM	Gadville McDonald	548	38.81	▼8.01
DNA	Samuel Joseph Strachan	12	0.85	▲0.24
Turnout		1,412		▼
Registered electors				
PLP hold				

General Election 2012: Cat Island, Rum Cay & San Salvador
Party	Candidate	Votes	%	±%
PLP	Philip Davis	778	52.57	▼5.55
FNM	Michael Pintard	693	46.82	▲4.94
DNA	Shawn Francis	9	0.61	New
Turnout		1,480		▲
Registered electors				
PLP hold				

General Election 2007: Cat Island, Rum Cay & San Salvador
Party	Candidate	Votes	%	±%
PLP	Philip Davis	809	58.12	▼7.28
FNM	Gladys Johnson-Sands	583	41.88	▲9.45
Turnout		1,392		▲
Registered electors				
PLP hold				

General Election 2002: Fort Charlotte
Party	Candidate	Votes	%	±%
PLP	Philip Davis	843	65.40	▲13
FNM	James Miller	418	32.43	▼19.97
Coalition + Labor	Gadville McDonald	28	2.17	New
Turnout		1,289		▲
Registered electors				
PLP gain from FNM				

General Election 1997: Fort Charlotte
Party	Candidate	Votes	%	±%
FNM	James H. Miller	654	52.4	
PLP	Philip Davis	594	47.6	
Turnout		1,248		
Registered electors				
FNM gain from PLP				
