= Bahamian dollar =

Currency

ISO 4217
- Code: BSD (numeric: 044)
- Subunit: 0.01

Units of account
- Symbol: $, B$
- Subunit
- 1/100: cent

Denominations
- Banknotes
- Freq. used: $1/2, $1, $3, $5, $10, $20, $50, $100
- Coins
- Freq. used: 5, 10, 15, 25 cents
- Rarely used: 50 cents, $1, $2

Demographics
- User(s): The Bahamas

Issuance
- Central bank: Central Bank of The Bahamas
- Website: www.centralbankbahamas.com
- Printer: De La Rue, Giesecke+Devrient, Oberthur Technologies, Orell Füssli, Canadian Bank Note Company

Valuation
- Inflation: 2.4%
- Source: The World Factbook, (2007 est.)
- Pegged with: US dollar at par

The dollar (sign: $; code: BSD) has been the currency of The Bahamas since 1966. It is normally abbreviated with the dollar sign $, or alternatively B$ to distinguish it from other dollar-denominated currencies. It is divided into 100 cents.

On 20 October 2020, the Bahamas became the first country to have a legal digital currency, introducing the Sand Dollar as an alternative to the traditional Bahamian dollar.

== Relationship with the US dollar ==
The Bahamian dollar is pegged to the US dollar on a one-to-one basis. The Central Bank of The Bahamas states that it uses reserve requirements, changes in the Bank discount rate and selective credit controls, supplemented by moral suasion, as main instruments of monetary policy. The Central Bank's objective is to keep stable conditions, including credit, in order to maintain the parity between the US dollar and the Bahamian dollar while allowing economic development to proceed.

Although the US dollar (as any other foreign currency) is subject to exchange control laws in The Bahamas, the parity between Bahamian dollars and US dollars means that any business will accept either US or Bahamian currency and many of the businesses that serve tourists have extra US dollars on hand for the convenience of American tourists.

== History ==
The dollar replaced the pound at a rate of 1 dollar = 7 shillings (US$0.98) in 1966, 7 years before independence. This rate allowed the establishment of parity with the US dollar, due to the sterling/dollar rate then being fixed at £1 = $2.80, after a slight revaluation of 2%. To aid in decimalisation, three-dollar bills and fifteen-cent coins were created, as three dollars was roughly equivalent to one pound, and fifteen cents to a shilling, at the time of transition.

On 20 October 2020, the Bahamas became the first country to have a legal digital currency, introducing the Sand Dollar as an alternative to the traditional Bahamian dollar.

== Coins ==
5 cent coin - 1968
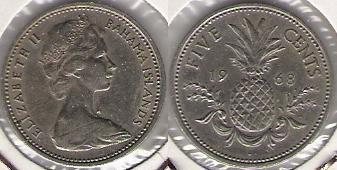
First side of the image: Queen Elizabeth II
Second side of the image: Pineapple

In 1966, coins were introduced in denominations of 1, 5, 10, 15, 25, 50 cents, 1 and 2 dollars. The 1 cent was struck in nickel-brass, the 5, 10, and 15 cent in cupronickel, the 25 cent in nickel, and the 50 cent and 1 dollar in silver. The 10 cent was scallop shaped, whilst the 15 cent was square. Silver coins were not issued for circulation after 1966. Bronze replaced nickel-brass in the 1 cent in 1970, followed by brass in 1974 and copper-plated zinc in 1985. In 1989, cupro-nickel 50 cent and 1 dollar coins were issued for circulation, although they did not replace the corresponding banknotes.

The now-obsolete 1 cent coin is about the size of a US dime, and the 5 and 25 cent coins are about the same size as their US counterparts but with different metal compositions. The 15 cent coins are still produced by the Central Bank. All coins now bear the Bahamian Coat of Arms on one side with the words "Commonwealth of The Bahamas" and the date. The reverses of the coins show objects from Bahamian culture with the value of the coins in words. The 1 cent has three starfish, the 5 cent a pineapple, the 10 cent two bonefish, the 15 cent a hibiscus, and the 25 cent a native sloop.

One-cent coins were last issued on January 31, 2020 and demonetised at the end of 2020. All cash transactions in the Bahamas are now rounded to the nearest five cents, while electronic transactions are still completed to the cent.

Coins of the Bahamian dollar (1974-2005 issues)
| Image | Value | Technical parameters | | | | Description | | | Date of first minting |
| Image | Value | Diameter | Thickness | Mass | Composition | Edge | Obverse | Reverse | Date of first minting |
|---|---|---|---|---|---|---|---|---|---|
| | 1 cent | 19.05 mm | 1.40 mm | 3.16 g | Nickel-brass | Smooth | Coat of arms of The Bahamas | Starfish | 1974 |
| | 1 cent | 19.00 mm | 1.40 mm | 2.50 g | Copper-plated zinc | Smooth | Coat of arms of The Bahamas | Starfish | 1985 |
| | 5 cents | 21.00 mm | 1.53 mm | 3.94 g | Copper-nickel | Smooth | Coat of arms of The Bahamas | Pineapple | 1974 |
| | 10 cents | 23.50 mm | 1.72 mm | 5.54 g | Copper-nickel | Smooth | Coat of arms of The Bahamas | Two Bonefish | 1974 |
| | 15 cents | 25.00 mm | 2.06 mm | 6.48 g | Copper-nickel | Smooth | Coat of arms of The Bahamas | Hibiscus | 1974 |
| | 25 cents | 24.26 mm | 1.9 mm | 6.9 g | Nickel | Reeded | Coat of arms of The Bahamas | Bahamian sailboat | 1974 |
| | 25 cents | 24.26 mm | 1.65 mm | 5.75 g | Copper-nickel | Reeded | Coat of arms of The Bahamas | Bahamian sailboat | 1991 |
| | 50 cents | 29 mm | | 10.51 g | Copper-nickel | Reeded | Coat of arms of The Bahamas | Blue marlin | 1974 |
| | 1 dollar | 32 mm | | 18.30 g | Copper-nickel | Reeded | Coat of arms of The Bahamas | Conch shell | 1981 |
| | 2 dollars | 40 mm | 2.5 mm | 26.9 g | Copper-nickel | Reeded | Coat of arms of The Bahamas | Two flamingos | 1974 |

Coins of the Bahamian dollar (2007-2018 issues)
| Image | Value | Technical parameters | | | | Description | | | Date of first minting |
| Image | Value | Diameter | Thickness | Mass | Composition | Edge | Obverse | Reverse | Date of first minting |
|---|---|---|---|---|---|---|---|---|---|
| | 1 cent | 17 mm | 1 mm | 1.70 g | Copper-plated steel | Smooth | Coat of arms of The Bahamas | Three starfish | 2014 |
| | 5 cents | 21 mm | 1.53 mm | 3.5 g | Nickel-plated steel | Smooth | Coat of arms of The Bahamas | Pineapple | 2015 |
| | 10 cents | 23.5 mm | 1.8 mm | 5.2 g | Nickel-plated steel | Smooth | Coat of arms of The Bahamas | Two bonefish | 2007 |
| | 15 cents | 25 mm | 2 mm | 6.48 g | Nickel-plated steel | Smooth | Coat of arms of The Bahamas | Three Hibiscus flowers | 2018 |
| | 25 cents | 24.3 mm | 1.7 mm | 5 g | Nickel-plated steel | Reeded | Coat of arms of The Bahamas | Bahamian sloop | 2007 |

== Banknotes ==
In 1966, the government introduced notes in denominations of 1/2, 1, 3, 5, 10, 20, 50 and 100 dollars. The Bahamas Monetary Authority took over the issuance of paper money in 1968, issuing the same denominations. The Central Bank of the Bahamas was established on 1 June 1974 and took over note issuance from that point forward. Its first issue of notes did not include the 1/2 and 3 dollar denominations but these were reintroduced in 1984.

The dollar has undergone several revisions in the last twenty years, one of the more notable being an extremely colourful redesign in celebration of the quincentennial of the landing of Christopher Columbus on a Bahamian island he named San Salvador.

All banknotes other than the fifty cent note have been undergoing design changes to foil forgery in recent years, although the notes implemented more stringent security long before the US's recent redesign of their notes. All banknotes are the same physical size, like the US dollar but unlike the euro. The latest counterfeit-proof formula is the "Counterfeit Resistant Integrated Security Product", or CRISP. The new $10 banknote was released on 5 August 2005, while the $20 banknote was released on 6 September 2006. In October 2005, someone counterfeited one of the new CRISP $10 bills, serial number A161315. Bahamian authorities warned merchants to look for banknotes that lacked the distinctive watermark.

Until 1992, all notes displayed a portrait of Queen Elizabeth II (Head of State) but notes began to display portraits of prominent deceased Bahamian politicians. This policy is now being reversed, with the return of the Queen's portrait to the $10 note. The $1/2 shows an older Queen Elizabeth II and the back shows a picture of Sister Sarah in the Nassau Straw Market; the $1 shows Sir Lynden Pindling and on the back the Royal Bahamas Police Force Band; the $3 has a young Queen Elizabeth II and on the back shows a Family Island Regatta with native sloops; the $5 – Sir Cecil Wallace-Whitfield and the back shows a Junkanoo group 'rushing' in the Junkanoo parade; the $10 – an older Queen Elizabeth II (replacing Sir Stafford Sands) and the back shows the Hope Town Lighthouse and settlement in Abaco, the $20 – Sir Milo Butler; the $50 – Sir Roland Symonette; the $100 – an older Queen Elizabeth II and the back shows a jumping blue marlin, the national fish of The Bahamas. For this reason, the Bahamian $100 bill is often referred to by locals as "a blue marlin".

Banknotes of the Bahamian dollar (2005 CRISP series)
| Value | Main Colour | Obverse | Reverse | Watermark |
|---|---|---|---|---|
| $1/2 | Moss green, charcoal grey, and dark turquoise | Queen Elizabeth II | Sister Sarah in the Nassau Market | Spanish Galleon (not a CRISP Series note) |
| $1 | Dark green, mint green and brown | Sir Lynden O. Pindling | Royal Bahamas Police force band | Sir Lynden O. Pindling with an electrotype 1 |
| $3 | Red, orange and purple | Queen Elizabeth II | Sailing boats | Spanish Galleon (not a CRISP Series note) |
| $5 | Orange, brown and blue | Sir Cecil Wallace-Whitfield | Junkanoo dance | Sir Cecil Wallace-Whitfield with an electrotype 5 |
| $10 | Dark blue, dark green and maroon | Queen Elizabeth II | Hope Town, Abaco Island | Queen Elizabeth II with an electrotype 10 |
| $10 | Dark blue, dark green and maroon | Sir Stafford Lofthouse Sands | Hope Town, Abaco Island | Stafford Sands with an electrotype 10 |
| $20 | Charcoal, red and green | Sir Milo B. Butler | Nassau Harbour | Sir Milo B. Butler with an electrotype 20 |
| $50 | Orange, brown and green | Sir Roland T. Symonette | The Central Bank of Bahamas building | Sir Ronald T. Symonette with an electrotype 50 |
| $100 | Purple, blue, green and mauve | Queen Elizabeth II | A blue marlin | Queen Elizabeth II with an electrotype 100 |

Since 2016, a new series called CRISP Evolution has been progressively introduced, maintaining the subjects and motifs of the previous banknotes while updating the security features and color schemes. The series began with the $10 on 28 September 2016 and includes the $1 from 27 September 2017, the $20 from September 2018, the $1/2 from 24 January 2019, the $3 note from 28 March 2019, the $50 note from 3 October 2019, the $5 note from 23 September 2020 and the $100 note on 6 October 2021.

Due to the $10 banknote being similar in colour to the $1 banknote, the $10 banknote in this series was updated to have a grey colour on 15 December 2022.

Banknotes of the Bahamian dollar (CRISP Evolution series, 2016–present)
| Value | Main Colour | Size | Obverse | Reverse | Introduction |
|---|---|---|---|---|---|
| $1/2 | Gray | 156 × 67 mm | Queen Elizabeth II | Sister Sarah in the Nassau Market | 24 January 2019 |
| $1 | Green | 156 × 67 mm | Sir Lynden O. Pindling | Royal Bahamas Police force band | 27 September 2017 |
| $3 | Fuchsia | 156 × 67 mm | Queen Elizabeth II | Sailing boats | 28 March 2019 |
| $5 | Orange | 156 × 67 mm | Sir Cecil Wallace-Whitfield | Junkanoo dance | 23 September 2020 |
| $10 | Blue | 156 × 67 mm | Sir Stafford Lofthouse Sands | Hope Town, Abaco Island | 28 September 2016 |
| $20 | Magenta | 156 × 67 mm | Sir Milo B. Butler | Nassau Harbour | 26 September 2018 |
| $50 | Cyan | 156 × 67 mm | Sir Roland T. Symonette | The Central Bank of Bahamas building | 3 October 2019 |
| $100 | Brown | 156 × 67 mm | Arthur Dion Hanna | Blue marlin | 6 October 2021 |

Current BSD exchange rates
| From Google Finance: | AUD CAD CHF CNY EUR GBP HKD JPY USD TRY EUR JPY |
| From Yahoo! Finance: | AUD CAD CHF CNY EUR GBP HKD JPY USD TRY EUR JPY |
| From XE.com: | AUD CAD CHF CNY EUR GBP HKD JPY USD TRY EUR JPY |
| From OANDA: | AUD CAD CHF CNY EUR GBP HKD JPY USD TRY EUR JPY |

== See also ==
- Central banks and currencies of the Caribbean
- Economy of the Bahamas
- Jamaican dollar
