= Ministry of Finance (The Bahamas) =

Government ministry of the Bahamas

Agency overview
- Formed: 1964
- Jurisdiction: Bahamas Government of the Bahamas
- Headquarters: Cecil Wallace-Whitfield Centre, West Bay Street, Nassau
- Minister responsible: Philip Davis
- Parent agency: Government of the Bahamas
- Website: www.bahamas.gov.bs/finance

The Ministry of Finance is a government ministry of the Bahamas responsible for the care and management of public finances. The development and management of the annual government budget is a major aspect of the ministry's function. Since 1984, Prime Minister of the Bahamas has mostly held the portfolio of Minister of Finance.

== Ministers of Finance ==
Name	Took office	Left office	Notes
Stafford Sands	1964	1967	
Carlton Elisha Francis	1967	1973	
Arthur D. Hanna	1973	1984	
Lynden O. Pindling	1984	1990	
Paul Adderley	1990	1992	
Hubert Ingraham	1992	1995	
William Clifford Allen	1995	2002	
Perry Christie	2002	2007	
Hubert Ingraham	2007	2012	
Perry Christie	2012	2017	
Peter Turnquest	2017	2020	
Hubert Minnis	2020	2021	
Philip Davis	2021	Incumbent	

== See also ==
- Government of the Bahamas
- Central Bank of the Bahamas
- Economy of the Bahamas
- Securities Commission of the Bahamas
