= St. Augustine's College (Bahamas) =

Coordinates: 25.0438°N 77.3047°W

Saint Augustine's College is a Bahamian Secondary School for grades 7 through 12. It was founded in January 1945 by Reverend Frederic U. Frey on Bernard Road on the island of New Providence, The Bahamas. St. Augustine's College is one of the premier high schools for education and sports in the Bahamas, with numerous honors and awards for the academic achievements of the institution's students, as well as several champions from its athletics department. Its athletic department's mascot, aptly titled "The Big Red Machine", is depicted by a red steam train racing down train-tracks. The Big Red Machine as of 2020 has won 31 BAISS track and field championships.

== Notable alumni ==
- Devynne Charlton, world record holder for the 60m hurdles.
- Wendy Craigg, first woman Governor of the Central Bank of the Bahamas
- Shaunae Miller-Uibo, 2016 Olympic 400m champion.
- Anthonique Strachan, 2012 Double Gold Medalist at the Junior World Championships in Barcelona.
