= Wendy Craigg =

Bahamian economist

Wendy Craigg is an economist from the Bahamas. From 2005 to 2015, she was governor of the Central Bank of the Bahamas. She is the first woman to hold this post. She subsequently served as a special advisor to the government of the Bahamas and chair of the Bahamas Civil Aviation Authority.

== Education ==
Craigg attended St Augustine's College, and later graduated with a BA in economics and business from the College of Mount Saint Vincent in New York City. She later earned an MBA at the University of Miami in Coral Gables, Florida and an MA in economics from Fordham University in New York City. She has also attended additional sector training run by the International Monetary Fund and Swiss National Bank.

== Career ==
Craigg began work with the Central Bank of The Bahamas on July 17, 1978, holding multiple positions including research director and deputy governor. She was appointed deputy governor in 1997, and subsequently governor of the bank in 2005, and is the first, and as of 2022, only woman to hold the position. She was succeeded by John Rolle. During her time as governor she worked to ensure that international standards and best practices were applied to banks and trust companies that established themselves in the country. On 31 December 2015, Craigg stepped down as governor of the bank, after serving her term of office.

In April 2020 she was appointed to the Government of the Bahamas' Economic Recovery Committee, created in response to the effects of the COVID-19 pandemic. In 2020, Craigg was offered the post of finance minister in the government of Hubert Minnis, following the resignation of K. Peter Turnquest. She declined the role. However, in December 2020 she had agreed to take up a role as one of a team of special advisors to the government. She is also Chair of the Bahamas Civil Aviation Authority Board.
