= 2022 Bahamas boat capsizing =

Maritime incident in the Bahamas

- Date: 24 July 2022
- Location: New Providence, The Bahamas
- Deaths: 17
- Injuries: 3

On 24 July 2022, at least 17 people died while on a boat near the Bahamas. The boat was reportedly heading towards Florida, when the boat capsized seven miles off of the coast of New Providence. An additional three people were hospitalized in the capsizing.

== Background ==
The Bahamas is a common transit route for Haitians attempting to reach the United States, although extreme conditions and rickety vessels in the Bahamas make traversing through the Bahamas dangerous.

== Incident ==
The incident occurred at roughly 1 a.m. EDT, according to Bahamian prime minister Philip Davis. Authorities claim that the boat was carrying between 50 and 60 people, and that passengers paid $3,000 to $8,000 to board the boat.

== Victims ==
At least 17 people died in the capsizing. Of the 17 people, 16 of them were female, including a child believed to be between the ages of 4 and 5. Authorities were able to recover 25 people from the boat, although an additional eight to 12 people are believed to be missing.
