= Englerston =

Bahamas parliamentary constituency

- Constituency
- Englerston is 19 on this map of the 2021 election
- District: New Providence
- Electorate: 4,923 (2021)

Current constituency
- Seats: 1
- Party: Progressive Liberal Party
- Member: Glenys Hanna Martin

Englerston is a parliamentary constituency represented in the House of Assembly of the Bahamas. It elects one member of parliament (MP) using the first past the post electoral system. It has been represented by Glenys Hanna Martin from the Progressive Liberal Party since 2002.

== Geography ==
The constituency comprises an inner city area of Nassau, the capital and largest city of the Bahamas. The 1920s suburb is named after its founder Romanian-born Jacob S. Engler.

== Members of Parliament ==
Election	Parliament	Candidate	Party
1977			
1982			
1987			
1992			
1997	9th Bahamian Parliament	Philip C. Galanis	Progressive Liberal Party
2002	10th Bahamian Parliament	Glenys Hanna Martin	Progressive Liberal Party
2007	11th Bahamian Parliament	Glenys Hanna Martin	Progressive Liberal Party
2012	12th Bahamian Parliament	Glenys Hanna Martin	Progressive Liberal Party
2017	13th Bahamian Parliament	Glenys Hanna Martin	Progressive Liberal Party
2021	14th Bahamian Parliament	Glenys Hanna Martin	Progressive Liberal Party
2026	15th Bahamian Parliament	Glenys Hanna Martin	Progressive Liberal Party

== Election results ==
2021
Party	Candidate	Votes	%	±%
PLP	Glenys Hanna Martin (incumbent)	2,249	75.32	▲26.32
FNM	Quintin Percentie	498	16.68	▼28.32
COI	Faith Percentie	163	5.46	▼10.8
DNA	Zhavargo Black	57	1.91	▼4.09
Grand Commonwealth Party	Kristen Hepburn	10	0.33	
Bahamas Constitution Party	Matthew Smith	9	0.30	
Turnout		2,986	60.65	
PLP hold				

== See also ==
- Constituencies of the Bahamas
