= The Black Moses =

- Film poster
- Directed by: Travolta Cooper
- Written by: Travolta Cooper
- Produced by: Greg Cayea; Carlos Smith; Douglas Chang; Cristhian Andrews
- Starring: Dennis Haysbert; Brian Mulroney; Jesse Jackson; Andrew Young; Marguerite Pindling; Pamela Poitier
- Cinematography: Joseph Ascioti; Neville Smith
- Edited by: Jackson Petit
- Music by: Cristhian Andrews
- Production companies: Y-Feye Media; Black Apple International; Audacity Innovative
- Release date: 8 December 2013 (Bahamas International Film Festival)
- Running time: 95 minutes
- Country: Bahamas
- Language: English

The Black Moses is a 2013 documentary film directed by Travolta Cooper. The film had its world premiere on 8 December 2013 at the Bahamas International Film Festival, where it served as the festival's closing film. It went on to show at several other film festivals and received a distribution deal at the 2014 Cannes Film Festival. The Black Moses received a theatrical release in the United States and the Bahamas on 10 October 2014.

The film stars Dennis Haysbert and documents the life and times of Lynden Pindling, the first black Prime Minister of The Bahamas.

== Premise ==
The film documents the life and times of Lynden Pindling and explores the idea of Pindling as a black national liberator and the rumors that he was involved in the drug trade. The Black Moses utilizes the ancient Moses legend and mythology as a model to tell the story and also features commentary from people such as Jesse Jackson, Andrew Young, Thabo Mbeki, and Pras Michel.

== Production ==
Planning for The Black Moses began in 2010 when Cooper received a grant from the Cable Cares Foundation. Actor Dennis Haysbert was brought on to the project to perform as Black Moses, a character that narrates the film and explores the mythology of Black Moses. Filming for The Black Moses took place over a period of several years, with principal photography commencing in 2011. While the bulk of production took place in Nassau, Bahamas, Cooper traveled to several locations including London, South Africa, and the United States in order to film commentators.

== Reception ==
The Nassau Guardian reviewed The Black Moses, writing that "At times it felt like the movie was an apologist's thesis on an infalliable leader - then 10 seconds later it painted a picture of a flawed man who was aware of his faults." However they went on to say that "It is the most fitting narrative for one of the most glorified and vilified figures in Bahamian history. Whether you agree with its message or not, it goes further than any other documentary/poem/metaphor in dealing with this subject."
