= Carlton Francis =

Bahamian politician (1919–1985)

Minister of Finance of the Bahamas
- In office 1967–1973
- Prime Minister: Lynden Pindling
- Preceded by: Stafford Sands
- Succeeded by: Arthur D. Hanna

Personal details
- Born: Carlton Elisha Francis; 1919 Miami
- Died: 9 December 1985 (aged 65–66)
- Party: Progressive Liberal Party

Carlton Francis was a Bahamian politician and former cabinet minister.

Francis was born on 14 November 1919 in Miami. He was educated in St Andrew's University in Scotland, and in the University of the West Indies. He worked as head teacher and principal. He also served as the president of the Bahamas Teachers' Union.

In 1965 Francis became the deputy chairman of the Progressive Liberal Party. In 1967 he was elected to House of Assembly and was made Minister of Finance, and he held that office until 1973. From 1970 to 1972 he also served as Minister of Education. From 1972 to 1973 he was also appointed as Minister of Development.

Francis resigned from the PLP cabinet in 1973 over the issue of gambling. He resigned from PLP in 1976, and ran unsuccessfully in the 1977 elections as independent. In 1978 he was ordained a reverend in the Baptist Church, and then served as pastor.

He died of diabetes on 9 December 1985.
