= Glenys Hanna Martin =

Bahamian politician and lawyer (born 1958)

Glenys Hanna-Martin
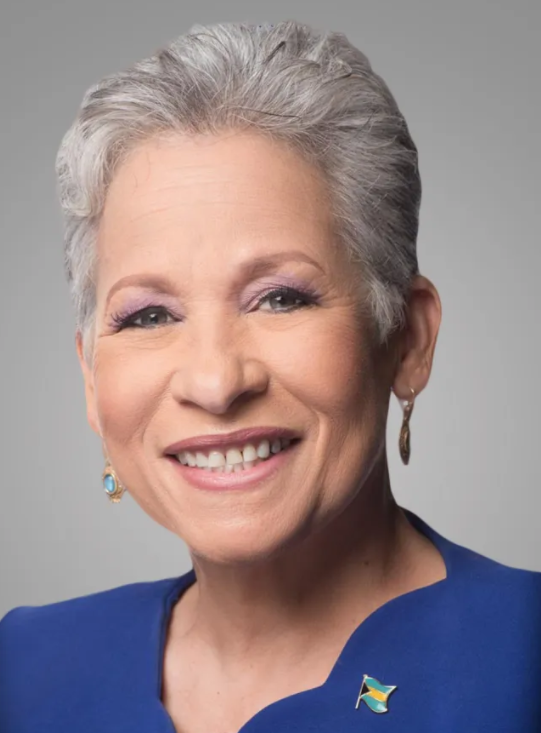

Minister of Tourism
- Incumbent
- Assumed office May 2026
- Prime Minister: Philip Davis
- Preceded by: Chester Cooper

Minister of Tourism
- Prime Minister: Philip Davis

Member of Parliament for Englerston
- Incumbent
- Assumed office 2002
- Preceded by: Philip C. Galanis

Personal details
- Born: Glenys Margaret Elaine Hanna; October 27, 1958 (age 67) Nassau, Bahamas
- Citizenship: Bahamas
- Party: Progressive Liberal Party
- Spouse: Leon "Onni" Martin
- Children: 3
- Parent: Arthur Dion Hanna (father)
- Education: York University; University of Buckingham

Glenys Margaret Elaine Hanna-Martin (née Hanna; born 27 October 1958) is a Bahamian Progressive Liberal Party politician and lawyer serving as Minister of Tourism since 2026. Prior to this she was Minister of Education Science and Technology from 2021 - 2026. She has been the Member of Parliament (MP) for Englerston since 2002, making her the country's longest serving female parliamentarian. Winning elections in 2002, 2007, 2012, 2017, 2021, and 2026

In 2008, Hanna-Martin became the first woman to hold the position of chairman of a political party in The Bahamas. She was the Minister of Transport and Aviation from 2002 to 2007 and 2012 to 2017.

== Early life ==
Glenys Hanna was born in Nassau on to the Hon. Arthur Dion Hanna and Beryl Hanna (née Church).

Her education began at St. Anne's School, Fox Hill. She later attended Queen's College, and matriculated from Padworth College, Reading, England. She continued her studies at York University, Toronto, Ontario, graduating in 1981 with a Bachelor of Arts (Specialized Honours) degree in English Literature. In 1985 she left for the University of Buckingham, England where she obtained her Bachelor of Laws with top honours having been awarded the Maxwell Law Prize by the institution.

Hanna Martin joined the Inner Temple, London and in 1988, after having successfully completed her Council of Legal Education Course, was called to the Bar of England and Wales, and The Bahamas bar.

== Career ==
In 1998, Hanna-Martin became Chairperson of the Women's Branch of the Progressive Liberal Party. She was originally nominated for the Holy Cross constituency against Carl Bethel.

Hanna Martin was moved from Holy Cross into Englerston before the 2002 election, when she was elected to the Assembly. In 2008, she was elected Chairman of the Progressive Liberal Party at its National Convention, becoming the first female to hold the post of chairman of any major political party in The Bahamas. She served as Minister of Transport and Aviation in both Perry Christie governments. She was previously Chair of the Bahamas Branch and immediate past Regional Representative of the Commonwealth Parliamentary Women's Association.

Hanna-Martin was one of only four PLP candidates to win or retain their seat in the 2017 general election. Now in her fifth term, she is the longest serving female Parliamentarian in the nation's history. She was also the first woman to run for the PLP leadership. When the PLP won in 2021, she was appointed Minister of Education, Technical and Vocational Training under Philip Davis.

== Personal life ==
Hanna-Martin was married to Leon "Onni" Martin for thirty years until his death in 2013. She is the mother of three and grandmother of two.
