= Michael McLaney =

American organized crime figure and casino operator

Michael Julius McLaney Sr.
- Born: February 1, 1915; New Orleans, Louisiana
- Died: July 24, 1994 (aged 79); Bal Harbor, Florida
- Other names: Mickey McLaney, Mike McLaney
- Occupations: Casino operator, FBI informant, sports gambler
- Era: Post-WWII, Cold War
- Organization(s): Mafia, National Crime Syndicate, New Orleans crime family
- Known for: Casino operations in Havana, the Bahamas, and Haiti; ties to the Mafia and the FBI; involvement in anti-Castro activities
- Criminal charges: Conspiracy, mail and wire fraud, perjury
- Relatives: William McLaney (brother, d. 2006); Michael Julius McLaney Jr. (son, d. 1998)

Michael Julius McLaney, Sr. also known as Mickey McLaney or Mike McLaney (1915 – 1994) was an American casino operator and sports gambler with close ties to the Mafia and to anti-Fidel Castro groups. He was also a Top Echelon Criminal Informant for the Federal Bureau of Investigation (FBI). (Note: "The FBI's Top Echelon Criminal Informant Program was established in 1961 when FBI Director J. Edgar Hoover instructed all Special Agents in Charge (SACs) to "develop particularly qualified, live sources within the upper echelon of the organized hoodlum element who will be capable of furnishing the quality information" needed to attack organized crime. In 1978, the FBI replaced that program with the Criminal Informant Program.” From The Federal Bureau of Investigation’s Compliance with the Attorney General’s Investigative Guidelines. Office of the Inspector General, U.S. Department of Justice, Sept. 2005, www.oig.justice.gov/sites/default/files/archive/special/0509/chapter3.htm#159. Special report.)

McLaney briefly owned a Havana casino which was shut down by the Castro government. He and his brother William McLaney (d. 2006) were allegedly involved in the failed 1961 Bay of Pigs Invasion and in Operation Mongoose, the campaign of terrorist attacks and covert operations against Cuba orchestrated by the U.S. Central Intelligence Agency (CIA) with the assistance of the Mafia and Cuban exiles.

In 1967 McLaney was implicated in bribing and then conspiring to assassinate Lynden Pindling, the Prime Minister of the Bahamas, following a failed attempt to obtain a casino license for himself and his associates. McLaney later moved to Haiti where he operated a casino under the protection of the Duvalier family.

Michael McLaney's name appears in documents released to the public from multiple investigations into both the 1963 assassination of John F. Kennedy and US actions against Cuba and Castro.

== Early enterprises ==
Michael McLaney was born in New Orleans in 1915. He became associated with the New Orleans crime boss Carlos Marcello before moving to Miami. McLaney was an accomplished tennis player, having entered tournaments as an amateur. He was also known as an excellent golfer; he declined to turn professional on the grounds that he could make more by hustling opponents for money. He claimed to have won $250,000 from Baltimore Colts owner and casino magnate Carroll Rosenbloom betting on one round of golf; McLaney was a guest of Rosenbloom in the owner's box at the 1958 NFL Championship Game.

By June 1959 the Federal Bureau of Investigation (FBI) had made McLaney the subject of an anti-racketeering case. An informant described McLaney as having been a "personal pro" and "front man" for sports executives Dan Topping and Del Webb; the latter was also a real-estate developer and casino owner in Las Vegas. The same informant reported that McLaney's main income derived from controlling lucrative concessions at horse racing tracks in Florida, New Jersey, and New Orleans.

== Havana ==
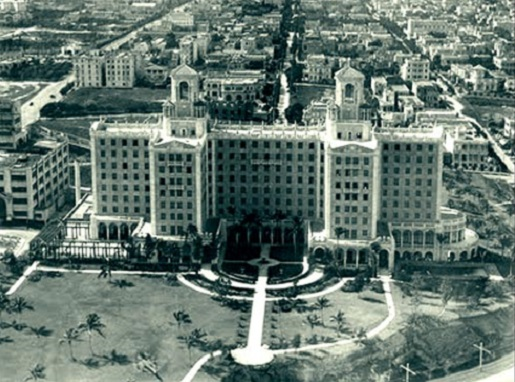
The Hotel Nacional de Cuba, site of the 1946 Havana Conference.

In September 1958 McLaney partnered with Rosenbloom to purchase a large share of the Casino Internacional in the Hotel Nacional de Cuba in Havana; McLaney later bought out Rosenbloom's shares. The hotel had long been tied to American organized crime (see Havana Conference); a Life magazine article from March 1958 reported that the casino was then operated by Miami-based crime boss Meyer Lansky. The country had been in the throes of revolution since 1952, and McLaney's Cuban venture was to be short-lived. Castro's forces entered Havana on January 8, 1959 and promptly shut down hotel and casino operations. The new government briefly held McLaney prisoner. McLaney was freed and the properties were nationalized in 1960. McLaney and other investors claimed substantial financial losses as a result.

== Miami ==
Upon his release from Havana, McLaney established himself in Miami, where he and associates within the National Crime Syndicate ("the Syndicate") hatched a conspiracy to bomb newly nationalized oil refineries in Cuba. (Note: Their aim was to undermine the Castro government, with the ultimate goal of resuming their casino business upon installation of a new, "friendly" ruler in the mold of the deposed Fulgencio Batista.) The refineries had been owned by the Esso, Shell Oil, and Texaco corporations. McLaney and his co-conspirators planned to launch their bombing attack in April 1961; this would have made it coincident with the Bay of Pigs Invasion.

Through informants, the FBI learned of McLaney's bomb plot. FBI director J. Edgar Hoover tipped Attorney General Robert F. Kennedy to the plan. An enraged Kennedy reportedly traveled to Florida and personally confronted McLaney to warn him off the plot, as the Attorney General knew that the three corporations intended to recover their refineries once Castro was removed. McLaney and other members of the Syndicate were recruited into Operation Mongoose around this time.

President John F. Kennedy was reportedly a frequent visitor to McLaney's villa in Miami Beach until his assassination in 1963.

A May 28, 1969 FBI memo reports that: "From 6/4/65 to 3/7/67, [McLaney] was an approved Top Echelon Criminal Informant and provided valuable information about hoodlums and gamblers. Hе was discontinued when he became involved in political activities in the Bahamas."

== The Bahamas ==
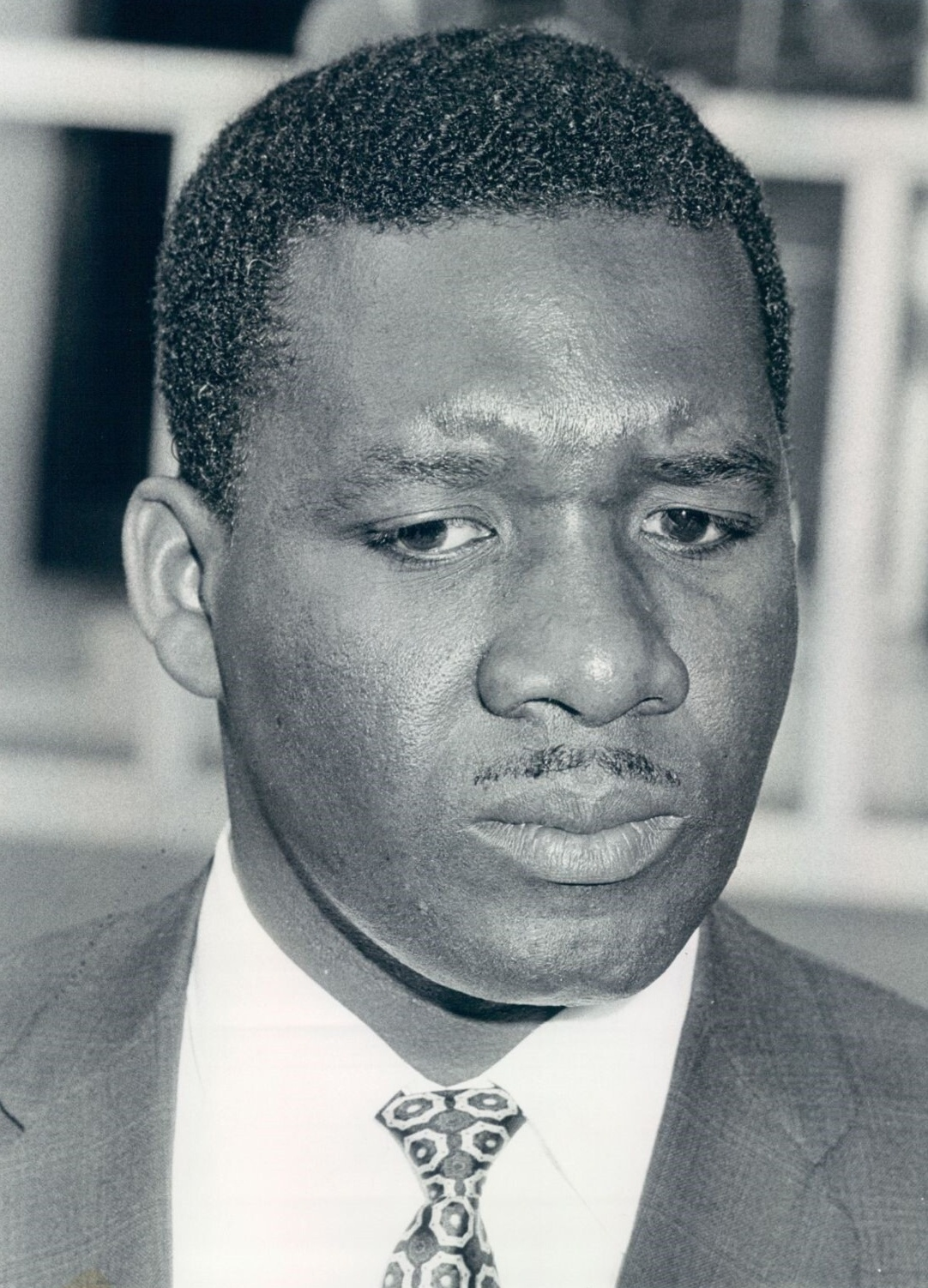
Lynden Pindling in 1971.

McLaney moved his operations offshore after Kennedy's assassination in November 1963. He formed a new partnership with Elliot Roosevelt—a son of President Franklin D. Roosevelt and former mayor of Miami Beach with known ties to the Syndicate—to operate a casino in the Bahamas.

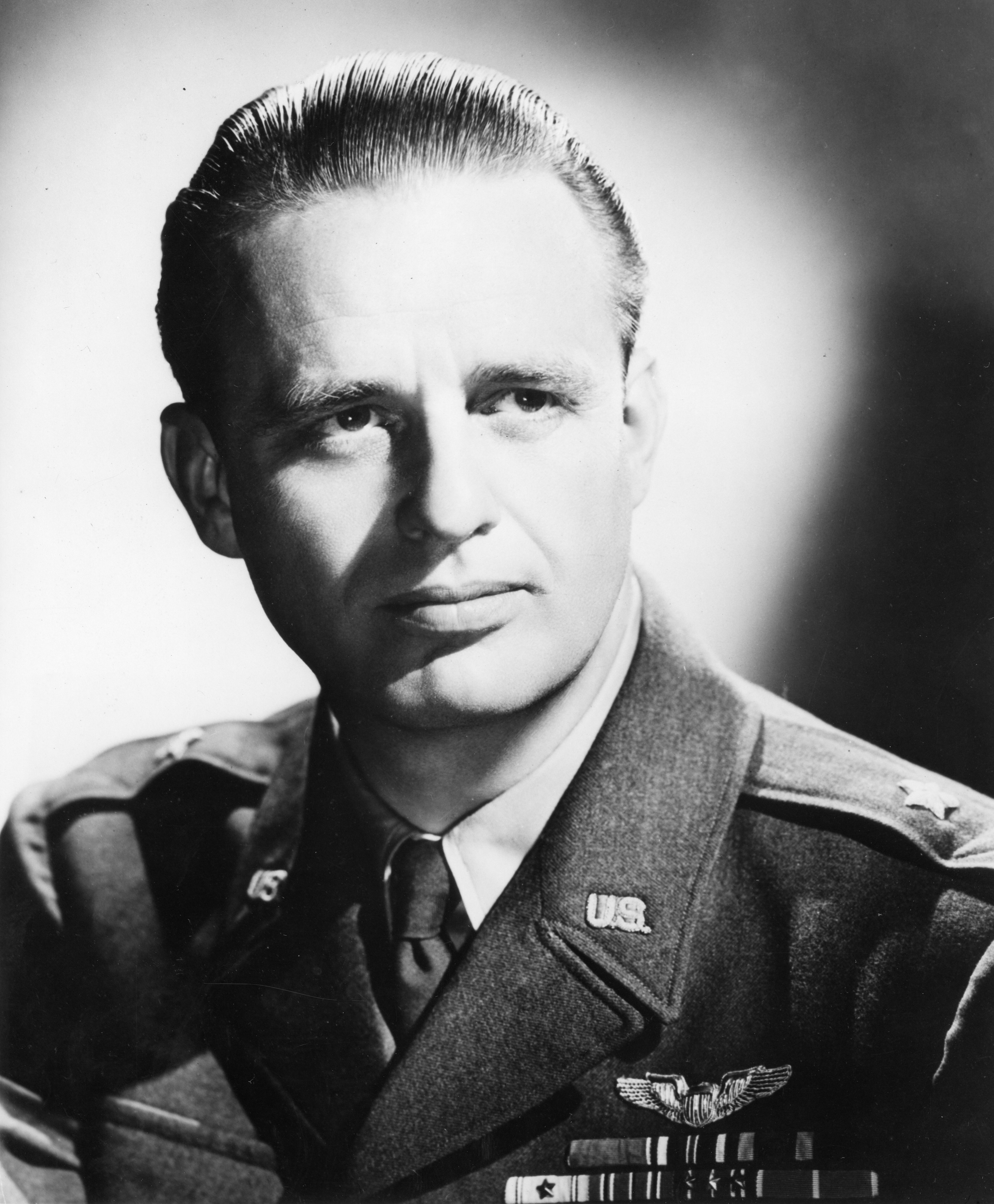
Elliot Roosevelt in 1945.

The Bahamian venture was embroiled in racketeering and influence-peddling from the start. McLaney financed Lynden Pindling in the 1967 Bahamas election for Prime Minister, offering cash and favors in exchange for a casino license upon assuming office. Pindling won the election but reneged on the casino deal when corruption charges came to light. A February 3, 1967 issue of Life magazine article alleged connections between Pindling and the Syndicate; the article named McLaney. (Note: McLaney sued Life publisher Time Inc. for libel. The Fifth Circuit Court of Appeals dismissed McLaney's suit, and the U.S. Supreme Court refused McLaney's appeal.)

A later US government investigation into organized crime and racketeering would confirm the allegations. In 1973, U.S. Senate Permanent Subcommittee on Investigations (PSI) under Senator Henry M. Jackson uncovered the extent of McLaney's and Roosevelt's dealings with Pindling; these included favors of cash, aircraft, boats, and the purchase of a campaign headquarters.

=== Conspiracy with Elliot Roosevelt to murder the Prime Minister ===
In 1968, McLaney and Roosevelt conspired to murder Pindling as revenge for Pindling's refusal to grant them a casino license. The plot failed; Pindling disavowed McLaney and escaped prosecution. Once elected Prime Minister, Pindling had McLaney deported from the Bahamas.

== Haiti ==
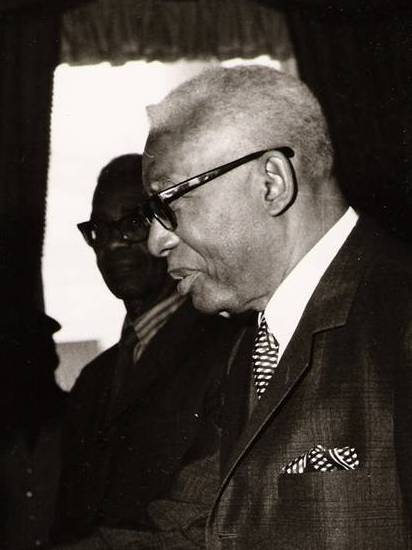
François "Papa Doc" Duvalier in 1968.

In August 1969 McLaney claimed that he obtained a license from Haitian dictator Francois “Papa Doc” Duvalier to operate a casino in Port-au-Prince scheduled to open that October. McLaney's family moved to Haiti in 1970. A 1973 Time magazine feature mentions him operating Haiti's sole casino under the Duvalier family regime.

== Indictments and convictions ==
In December 1970 McLaney was convicted of the federal crime of conspiracy to defraud the US Securities and Exchange Commission by filing false statements concerning the acquisition of a conglomerate corporation.

== Death ==
McLaney died in Florida in 1994.

== Sources ==
=== Book sources ===
Flammonde, Paris (1969). "Six: The Cubans". The Kennedy Conspiracy: An Uncommissioned Report on the Jim Garrison Investigation (PDF). Meredith Press. p. 111. LCCN 68-9531.

Hersh, Burton (2008). Bobby and J. Edgar: The Historic Face-Off Between the Kennedys and J. Edgar Hoover that Transformed America. Basic Books. ISBN 9780465006076.

Kaiser, David (2008). "The Big Easy". The Road to Dallas: The Assassination of John F. Kennedy. Harvard University Press. doi:10.4159/9780674039285-009. ISBN 978-0-674-02766-4.

Russo, Gus (1998). Live by the Sword: The Secret War Against Castro and the Death of JFK. Bancroft Press. ISBN 978-1-890862-98-5.

=== Media sources ===
"Faquin Overcomes Moylan in 4 Sets; Wins in Public Parks Tennis by 6-3". The New York Times. August 17, 1939. p. 24.

"Mobsters Move in on Troubled Havana and Split Rich Gambling Profits with Batista". Life. March 10, 1958. pp. 32–37.

"Financier and 3 Aides Guilty Of Plotting to Defraud S.E.C." The New York Times. December 15, 1970. p. 20.

"Modern Living: Haiti: New Island in the Sun". Time. January 28, 1973.

Crewdson, John M. (October 5, 1973). "A Gambler Says He Made a Deal With Pindling; Haiti Casino Operator Testifies". The New York Times.

"Investigations: Accusing a Roosevelt". Time. September 26, 1977.

"Obituary for MICHAEL J McLANEY". The Miami Herald. Miami, Florida. July 1994 – via Newspapers.com.

"William McLaney Obituary (2007) - New Orleans, LA - The Times-Picayune". Legacy.com.

"Obituary for Michael J. McLaney, Jr". The Miami Herald. Miami, Florida. September 12, 2001. p. 4B – via Newspapers.com.

=== Archives and records sources ===
FBI (June 30, 1959). Subjects: Michael McLaney (PDF) (Report). National Archives and Records Administration. docid 32340020.

"FBI report (no title, dated 10/01/1965)". www.maryferrell.org. Archived from the original on 2025-01-24.

FBI (February 16, 1967). FBI Airtel from SAC, New Orleans to Director, FBI regarding NO 1232-C-TE (Mike McLaney) (PDF) (Declassified FBI memorandum). John F. Kennedy Assassination Records Collection Act of 1992. Washington, D.C.: National Archives and Records Administration. NARA Record No. 124-90154-10135; Document ID 32340106.

FBI Miami Field Office (April 21, 1969). Gambling Activities Caribbean Area (PDF) (Report). National Archives and Records Administration. Record Number: 124-90154-10032 / DocID: 32340003.

FBI (May 28, 1969). Subjects: Michael J. McLaney, Michael McLaney (PDF) (Report). The President John F. Kennedy Assassination Records Collection. National Archives and Records Administration. Record Number 124-10230-10433, DocID: 32340044.

Ford, Gerald (July 1976). Motivation Behind the Assassination of John F. Kennedy (PDF) (Report). Ann Arbor, MI: National Archives and Records Administration. Document 0014/1075850.

"The Federal Bureau of Investigation's Compliance with the Attorney General's Investigative Guidelines Chapter Three: The Attorney General's Guidelines Regarding the Use of Confidential Informants" (Special Report). Office of the Inspector General, U.S. Department of Justice. September 2005.

Prados, John; Jimenez-Bacardi, Arturo, eds. (October 3, 2019). Kennedy and Cuba: Operation Mongoose. National Security Archive (Report). Washington, D.C.: The George Washington University. Archived from the original on November 2, 2019.

=== Web sources ===
"Famous Deportations Part 1 - Man Who Claimed He Loaned Pindling Money For 1967 Campaign, Deported 1969, Named In Plot To Kill Pindling 1973 · Bahamianology". Bahamianology. 2019-10-14.

"Gangsterismo: The U.S., Cuba and the Mafia". Progreso Weekly. 2015-01-16.
