= Ministry of Education and Technical and Vocational Training =

Government ministry of the Bahamas

Agency overview
- Formed: 1964
- Jurisdiction: Bahamas Government of the Bahamas
- Minister responsible: Glenys Hanna Martin
- Parent agency: Government of the Bahamas
- Website: The Bahamas Ministry of Education & Technical & Vocational Training

The Ministry of Education and Technical and Vocational Training is a government ministry of the Bahamas responsible for public education. Prior to 2021, it was named the Ministry of Education, Science & Technology.

== Ministers of Education ==
Name	Took office	Left office	Notes
Godfrey Kelly	1964	1967	
Arthur D. Hanna	1967	1968	
Cecil Wallace-Whitfield	1968	1970	
Carlton Francis	1970	1972	
Livingston Coakley	1972	1982	
Darrell Rolle	1982	1984	
Paul Adderley	1984	1990	
Bernard Nottage	1990	1992	
Cornelius A. Smith	1992	1994	
Ivy Dumont	1995	2001	
Dion Foulkes	2001	2002	
Alfred Sears	2002	2007	
Carl Bethel	2007	2009	
Desmond Bannister	2009	2012	
Jerome Fitzgerald	2012	2017	
Jeffrey L. Lloyd	2017	2021	
Glenys Hanna Martin	2021	Incumbent	

== See also ==
- Government of the Bahamas
- Education in the Bahamas
