= William C. Allen (Bahamian politician) =

Bahamian politician (1937–2021)

William Allen

Minister of Finance of The Bahamas
- In office 1995–2002
- Prime Minister: Hubert Ingraham
- Preceded by: Hubert Ingraham
- Succeeded by: Perry Christie

Personal details
- Born: 1937
- Died: 6 January 2021 (aged 83–84) New Providence
- Party: Free National Movement

Sir William Clifford Allen was a politician and central banker from The Bahamas.

Allen was born in 1937. He had a bachelor's degree in accounting from New York University and a Master of Science degree in international finance from Baruch College.

Allen was appointed as deputy governor of the Central Bank of the Bahamas in 1974. He was the governor of the Central Bank of the Bahamas from 1980 to 1987.

Allen was appointed into the Senate of The Bahamas in 1992 as a government senator. In the elections of 1994 he was elected to the Bahamas House of Assembly. He was appointed minister of finance from 1995 to 2002.

Allen died on 6 January 2021 in his home in New Providence.

In 2000, he was made a Knight Commander of the Order of St Michael and St George (KCMG).
