= Arthur Foulkes =

Bahamian politician (born 1928)

The Most Honourable Sir Arthur Foulkes ON, GCMG
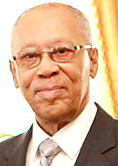
- Foulkes, c. 2000

9th Governor-General of the Bahamas
- In office 14 April 2010 – 7 July 2014
- Monarch: Elizabeth II
- Prime Minister: Hubert Ingraham; Perry Christie
- Preceded by: A.D. Hanna
- Succeeded by: Dame Marguerite Pindling

Personal details
- Born: Arthur Alexander Foulkes; 11 May 1928 (age 98) Matthew Town, Inagua, The Bahamas
- Party: Progressive Liberal Party (before 1971); Free National Movement (1971–present)
- Spouse: Joan Eleanor Foulkes

Sir Arthur Alexander Foulkes, ON, GCMG (born 11 May 1928) is a Bahamian politician who was the ninth governor-general of the Bahamas from 2010 to 2014.

Foulkes was elected to the House of Assembly in 1967 and served in the government of Lynden Pindling as Minister of Communications and Minister of Tourism. In 1971, he was co-founder of the Free National Movement, and he was appointed to the Senate in 1972 and 1977 before returning to the House of Assembly in 1982.

== Early life ==
Foulkes, a native of the Bahamas, was born on the island of Inagua in Matthew Town on 11 May 1928. His parents were Dr. William and Mrs. Julie (née Maisonneuve) Foulkes. Foulkes is married to the former Joan Eleanor Bullard of Nassau.

== Career ==
=== Newspaper career ===
Viceregal styles of Sir Arthur Foulkes (2010–2014)
- Reference style: His Excellency
- Spoken style: Your Excellency

Foulkes started his working life as a newspaper linotype operator, first at the Nassau Guardian, then at the competing Tribune newspaper. He became a reporter for Tribune's editor Sir Étienne Dupuch, rising to become News Editor of Tribune. From 1962 to 1967, Foulkes was founding editor of Bahamian Times, the official paper of the Progressive Liberal Party, backing the campaign for majority rule, and later a columnist for Nassau Guardian and Tribune.

=== Political career ===
In 1967, he was elected to Parliament and, the following year, appointed to serve in the Cabinet as Minister of Communications, then as Minister of Tourism. He was one of the founders of the Free National Movement in 1971. He was appointed to the Senate in 1972 and 1977, and re-elected to the House of Assembly in 1982. In 1972, Foulkes was one of the four Opposition delegates to the Bahamas Independence Constitution Conference in London in 1972.

In 1992, Foulkes became the Bahamas' High Commissioner to the United Kingdom, serving also as ambassador to France, Germany, Italy, Belgium and the European Union, before becoming the first Bahamian ambassador to China and Cuba in 1999. Foulkes was sworn in as Governor-General of the Bahamas on 14 May 2010, retiring on 7 July 2014.

== Honours and awards ==
Foulkes was appointed a Knight Commander of the Order of Saint Michael and Saint George (KCMG) in 2001; he was promoted to Knight Grand Cross of the same Order (GCMG) in 2011. In 2018, he was invested with the Order of the Nation (ON) by the then Governor General Marguerite Pindling.

Government offices
Preceded by Arthur Dion Hanna	Governor General of the Bahamas; 2010–2014	Succeeded by Marguerite Pindling
