= Philip Davis (Bahamian politician) =

Prime Minister of the Bahamas since 2021

The Most Honourable Philip Davis KC MP
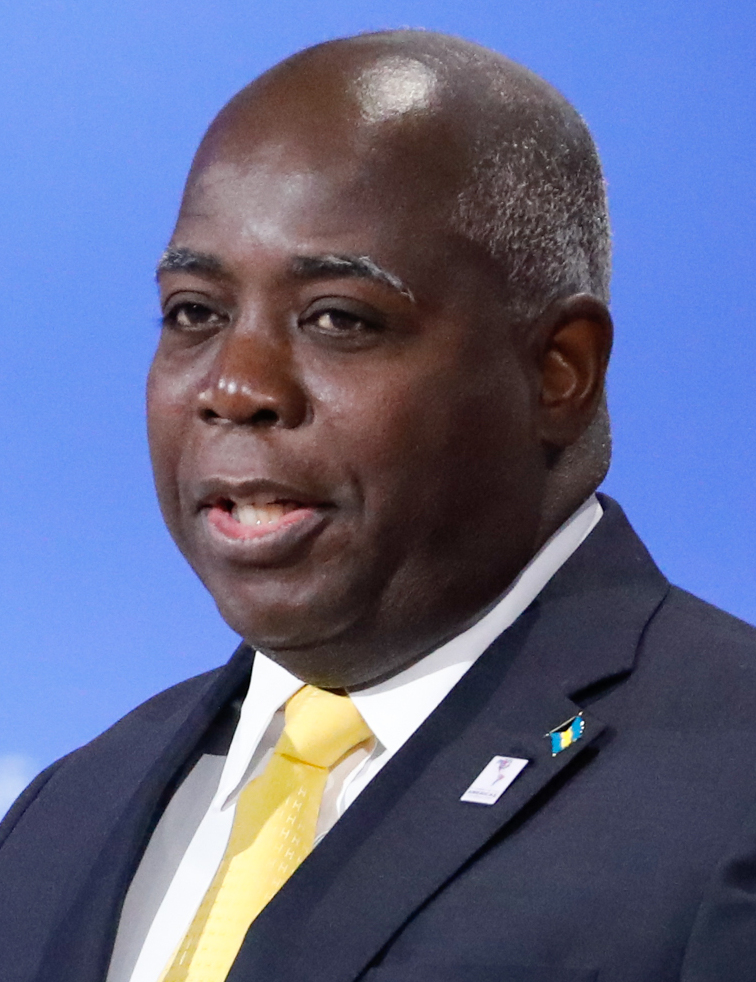
- Davis in 2022

5th Prime Minister of the Bahamas
- Incumbent
- Assumed office 17 September 2021
- Monarchs: Elizabeth II; Charles III
- Governors-General: Cornelius A. Smith; Cynthia A. Pratt
- Deputy: Chester Cooper
- Preceded by: Hubert Minnis

Leader of the Opposition
- In office 19 May 2017 – 17 September 2021
- Monarch: Elizabeth II
- Prime Minister: Hubert Minnis
- Preceded by: Loretta Butler-Turner
- Succeeded by: Hubert Minnis
Ministerial positions
Minister of Finance
In office 23 September 2021 – 16 May 2026
Preceded by	Hubert Minnis
Succeeded by	Michael Halkitis
Deputy Prime Minister of the Bahamas
In office 9 May 2012 – 11 May 2017
Prime Minister	Perry Christie
Preceded by	Brent Symonette
Succeeded by	K. Peter Turnquest
Minister of Public Works and Urban Development
In office 9 May 2012 – 11 May 2017
Prime Minister	Perry Christie

Member of Parliament for Cat Island, Rum Cay & San Salvador
- Incumbent
- Assumed office 2 May 2002
- Preceded by: James Miller
- In office 19 August 1992 – 14 March 1997
- Preceded by: Constituency established
- Succeeded by: James Miller
Other offices held
Chairman of the Caribbean Community
In office 1 January 2023 – 30 June 2023
Secretary-General	Carla Barnett
Preceded by	Chan Santokhi
Succeeded by	Roosevelt Skerrit

Personal details
- Born: Philip Edward Davis; 7 June 1951 (age 74) New Providence, Bahamas, British West Indies
- Party: Progressive Liberal Party
- Spouse: Ann Marie Davis
- Children: 6

Philip Edward Davis KC MP (born 7 June 1951) is a Bahamian lawyer and politician who has served as the fifth prime minister of The Bahamas since 2021. He served as minister of finance from 2021 to 2026. He has led the Progressive Liberal Party (PLP) since 2017 and has represented Cat Island, Rum Cay & San Salvador in the House of Assembly since 2002, having previously held the seat from 1992 to 1997.

Davis was a practising lawyer before entering frontline politics and was appointed Queen's Counsel in 2015, later becoming King's Counsel. He served as deputy prime minister and minister of works and urban development under Perry Christie from 2012 to 2017. After the PLP's defeat in the 2017 Bahamian general election, he became leader of the opposition and was elected PLP leader later that year.

Davis led the PLP to victory in the 2021 Bahamian general election, defeating the governing Free National Movement of Hubert Minnis. He led the PLP to victory again in the 2026 Bahamian general election, making him the first Bahamian prime minister to be re-elected to a consecutive term since the 1997 election.

== Early life and education ==
Davis was born in New Providence on 7 June 1951, the eldest of eight children of Brave Edward Davis of Old Bight, Cat Island, and Dorothy Davis, née Smith, of Alexander, Exuma. He spent part of his childhood on Cat Island with his grandparents, who farmed for a living.

After returning to Nassau, Davis attended Eastern Prep School, Eastern Junior School and St. John's College. He began working at a young age to help pay his school fees. He graduated from St. John's College in 1968 with six GCE O Levels, then worked as a construction worker and later at Barclays Bank before entering the legal profession.

== Legal career ==
Davis entered the legal profession as an articled clerk at Wallace-Whitfield & Barnwell and was called to the Bar of the Commonwealth of The Bahamas on 5 March 1975. He later practised at Davis & Co., a law firm previously known as Christie, Ingraham & Co. and Christie, Davis & Co.

Davis served two terms as vice president of the Bar Council and later as president of the Bahamas Bar Association. He was also a member of the Council of Legal Education for CARICOM. In January 2015, he was appointed Queen's Counsel, along with ten other members of the Bahamas Bar. After the accession of Charles III, the title became King's Counsel.

== Political career ==
=== Early parliamentary career ===
Davis became involved with the Progressive Liberal Party (PLP) as a teenager and volunteered during the 1967 Bahamian general election. He was first elected to the House of Assembly for Cat Island, Rum Cay & San Salvador in 1992. After losing the seat in the 1997 Bahamian general election, Davis returned to Parliament in the 2002 Bahamian general election and has represented the constituency since then.

By the time of the 2012 Bahamian general election, Davis was deputy leader of the PLP under Perry Christie. After the PLP defeated the Free National Movement (FNM), Davis was sworn in on 9 May 2012 as deputy prime minister and minister of works and urban development.

=== Deputy prime minister and minister of works ===
As minister of works and urban development, Davis was responsible for public works, infrastructure and urban development programmes. Two major projects handled by the ministry during his tenure were the New Providence Road Improvement Project and the Urban Renewal Small Home Repairs Programme. Under the small home repairs programme, more than 1,000 homes were repaired in New Providence and the Family Islands.

=== Leader of the opposition and PLP leader ===
The PLP was heavily defeated in the 2017 Bahamian general election, winning four seats against 35 for the FNM. Davis retained his seat and was sworn in as leader of the opposition on 19 May 2017.

After Perry Christie stepped down as PLP leader following the election defeat, Davis became interim party leader and then contested the leadership at the party's October 2017 convention. He was elected PLP leader on 25 October 2017, defeating Glenys Hanna Martin by 1,004 votes to 300; Chester Cooper was elected deputy leader.

=== Prime minister ===
Davis led the PLP in the 2021 Bahamian general election, which was held during the COVID-19 pandemic and after a sharp downturn in the tourism-dependent Bahamian economy. Outgoing prime minister Hubert Minnis conceded defeat after the vote. The PLP won 32 of the 39 seats in the House of Assembly, while the FNM won seven. Davis was re-elected in Cat Island, Rum Cay & San Salvador and delivered his victory speech in Cat Island. Davis was sworn in as the fifth prime minister of The Bahamas on 17 September 2021, with a public presentation of his instruments of appointment held the next day. Davis also became minister of finance in the new government. Cooper was appointed deputy prime minister and minister of tourism, investment and aviation.

During his first term as prime minister and minister of finance, Davis oversaw the country's recovery from the pandemic-era collapse in tourism, while debt, fiscal consolidation and the cost of living remained major policy issues. At the end of June 2021, national debt stood at $10.356 billion, and the Ministry of Finance forecast a $951 million deficit for the 2021–2022 fiscal year. In 2026, the International Monetary Fund said the Bahamian economy had strengthened in recent years and that the fiscal deficit had narrowed to 0.5 percent of GDP in fiscal year 2024/25. His government lowered the standard value-added tax rate from 12 percent to 10 percent and later removed VAT from unprepared food sold in grocery stores from 1 April 2026.

Davis made climate change and climate finance for small island developing states a major theme of his foreign policy. In August 2022, he hosted Caribbean leaders in Nassau ahead of COP27 and urged regional governments to press developed countries for climate finance and eligibility rules based on vulnerability to climate shocks. He served as chairman of the Caribbean Community from 1 January to 30 June 2023 and presided over the 44th Regular Meeting of CARICOM Heads of Government, held in Nassau in February 2023. In 2024, The Bahamas completed a debt-for-nature swap that unlocked more than $120 million for ocean conservation and mangrove restoration.

Davis's government also received criticism over governance and anti-corruption reforms, including delays in fully implementing the Freedom of Information Act. Similar issues arose over policing and independent oversight. In 2025, the government advanced legislation to create an Independent Commission of Investigations and a protected disclosures framework.

On 1 April 2026, Davis announced that Parliament would be dissolved and that an early general election would be held on 12 May, although an election had not been due until mid-October. An official in Davis's office later said the early timing was intended to avoid disruption from the upcoming Atlantic hurricane season. The PLP won the election with 33 of the 41 seats in the House of Assembly. Davis was re-elected in Cat Island, Rum Cay & San Salvador. Davis was sworn in for his second term as prime minister on 14 May. Senior cabinet ministers were sworn in on 15 May, and the full Cabinet and ministerial team was announced on 18 May.

== Personal life ==
Davis is married to Ann Marie Davis, a retired chartered accountant and humanitarian who has advocated for women's and girls' empowerment and against gender-based violence. She has also been involved in the work of the Bahamas Humane Society.

Davis has six children and is Anglican.

Davis was involved with the First Bahamas Branch of Toastmasters, also known as Club 1600, and served as its president in 1979.

== See also ==
- List of current heads of state and government
- List of heads of the executive by approval rating
- Cabinet of the Bahamas

Political offices
Preceded by Hubert Minnis	Prime Minister of the Bahamas; 2021–present	Incumbent
