= Coat of arms of the Bahamas =

National coat of arms

- Armiger: Commonwealth of The Bahamas
- Adopted: 7 December 1971
- Crest: Upon a representation of Our Royal Helmet mantled Azure doubled Argent on a Wreath Or and Azure. A Conch Shell proper in front of a Panache of Palm Fronds proper.
- Torse: Orange and Azure
- Shield: Upon a representation of the Santa Maria on a base barry wavy of four Azure and Argent on a Chief Azure demi-sun Or.
- Supporters: On the dexter side a Marlin proper and on the sinister side a Flamingo proper
- Compartment: Per pale Waves of the Sea and Swampland proper.
- Motto: Forward, Upward, Onward Together

Emblem of the Bahamas, 1964. Motto: Expulsis Piratis – Restituta Commercia (Pirates Expelled – Commerce Restored)

The coat of arms of the Bahamas contains a shield with the national symbols as its focal point.

== Official description ==
The blazon of the coat of arms is described in Bahamas law:

Arms: Upon a representation of the Santa María on a base barry wavy of four Azure and Argent on a Chief Azure demisun Or.

Crest: Upon a representation of Our Royal Helmet mantled Azure doubled Argent on a Wreath Or and Azure. A Conch Shell proper in front of a Panache of Palm Fronds proper.

Supporters: On the dexter side a Marlin proper and on the sinister side a Flamingo proper; and upon a Compartment per pale Waves of the Sea and Swampland proper.

Motto: “Forward, Upward, Onward Together”.

== Explanation ==
The escutcheon (shield) is supported by an Atlantic blue marlin and Caribbean flamingo. The crest on top of the helm (helmet) is a conch shell, which represents the varied marine life of the island chain. Below the helm is the escutcheon itself, whose main charge is a ship, reputed to represent the Santa María of Christopher Columbus. It is sailing beneath a sun in the chief. The animals supporting the shield are the national animals, and the national motto is found at the bottom. The flamingo is located upon land, and the marlin upon sea, indicating the geography of the islands.

The vibrant tinctures of the coat of arms were designed to symbolize the islands' bright future. Reportedly, the were also maintained due to their attractiveness to tourists.

The coat of arms was approved by Queen Elizabeth II on 7 December 1971. It was designed by Bahamian artist and clergyman Dr. Hervis L. Bain, Jr., who is also a member of the Order of the British Empire.

== History ==
Crown Colony of the Bahamas
Emblem	Period of use	Notes
	1869–1904; 1953-1964	Colonial badge of the Bahamas. Depicting a British ship chasing two pirate ships out at the high seas and the motto "Expulsis piratis restituta commercia" (Pirates expelled, commerce restored)
	1904–1953	The coat of arms remained the same but the crown was changed to a Tudor Crown.
	1964–1973	On 1964, the coat of arms was changed to a higher detailed version with the "Bahamas" text colour changing to blue and a Tudor rose between the motto.

== Island arms ==
In addition to the National Coat of Arms, there are a total of eighteen regional island shields (including two unofficial devices). These were granted upon Independence in 1973, to be displayed at the Independence day celebration to reflect each island's individual cultural heritage.

Island arms of the Commonwealth of the Bahamas
Acklins	Abaco	Andros	Berry Islands
Bimini	Cat Island	Crooked Island	Eleuthera
Grand Bahama	Inagua	Long Island	Mayaguana
New Providence	Ragged Island	Rum Cay	San Salvador
