= 1992 Bahamian general election =

National election

- 19 August 1992

All 49 seats in the House of Assembly 25 seats needed for a majority
- Registered: 122,939
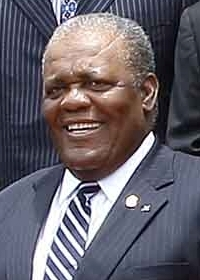

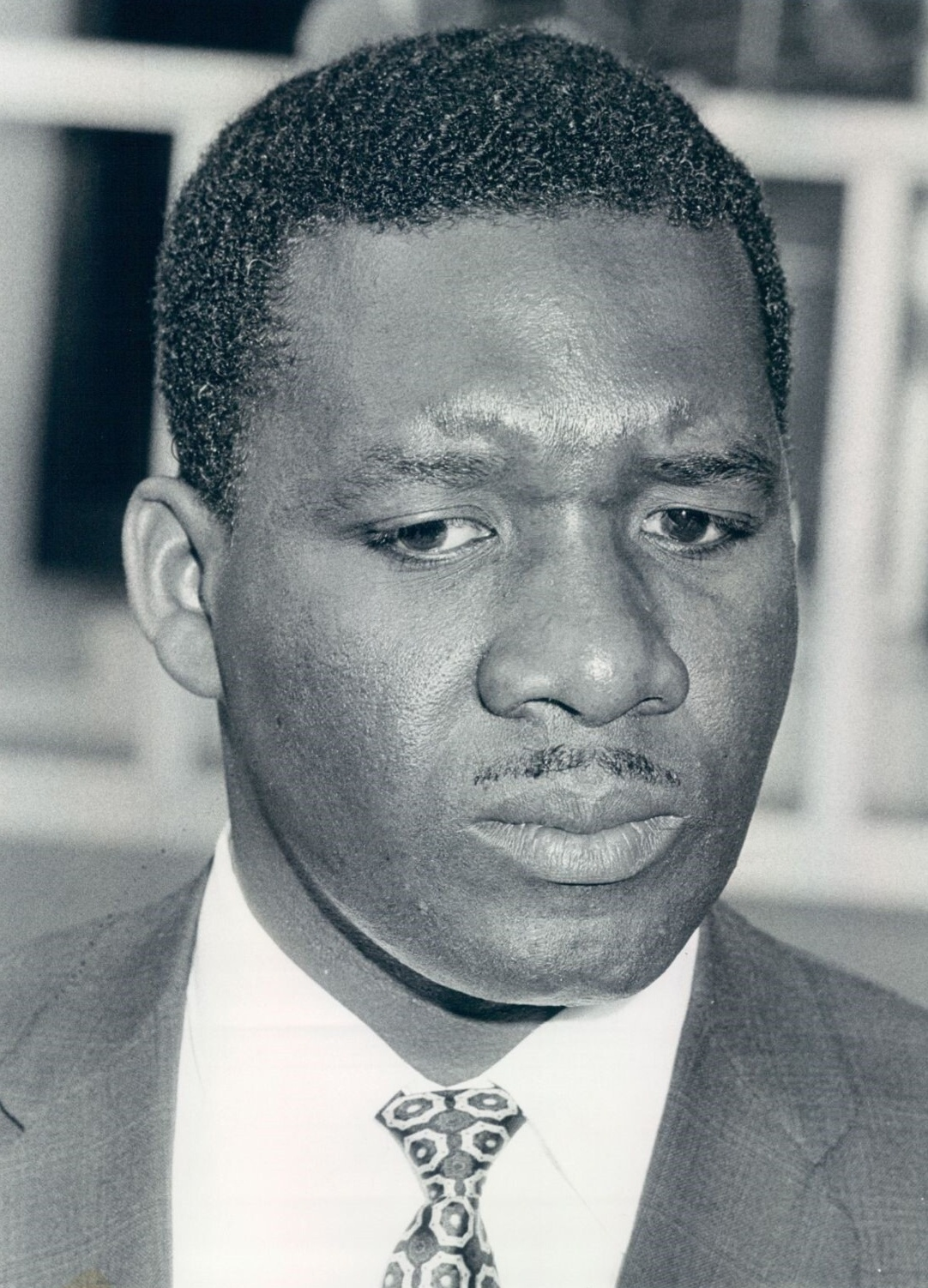
	First party	Second party
Leader	Hubert Ingraham	Lynden Pindling
Party	FNM	PLP
Leader's seat	North Abaco	Mangrove Cay and South Andros
Last election	43.21%, 16 seats	53.54%, 31 seats
Seats won	33	16
Seat change	▲17	▼15
Popular vote	61,799	50,258
Percentage	55.15%	44.85%
Swing	▲11.94 pp	▼8.69 pp
Prime Minister before election
Lynden Pindling
PLP
Elected Prime Minister
Hubert Ingraham
FNM

General elections were held in the Bahamas on 19 August 1992. The result was a victory for the opposition Free National Movement (FNM), which received 55% of the vote and won 33 of the 49 seats in the House of Assembly, while the ruling Progressive Liberal Party (PLP) lost nearly half their seats, winning only 16.

The elections marked the first change of government in the Bahamas since independence in 1973 as the PLP had dominated the country's politics since the latter days of colonial rule. Lynden Pindling, who had been head of government since 1967, was succeeded as prime minister by FNM leader Hubert Ingraham.

== Results ==
Party	Votes	%	Seats	+/–
Free National Movement	61,799	55.15	33	+17
Progressive Liberal Party	50,258	44.85	16	–15
Total	112,057	100.00	49	0
Registered voters/turnout	122,939	–		
Source: Nohlen
