= Hubert Ingraham =

Bahamian politician (born 1947)

The Right Honourable Hubert Ingraham PC
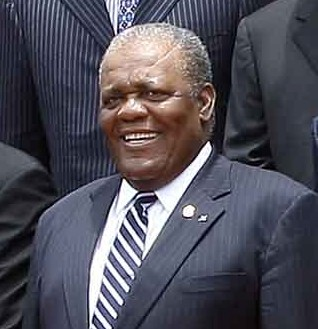
- Ingraham in 2009

2nd Prime Minister of The Bahamas
- In office 4 May 2007 – 8 May 2012
- Monarch: Elizabeth II
- Governors-General: A.D. Hanna; Sir Arthur Foulkes
- Deputy: Brent Symonette
- Preceded by: Perry Christie
- Succeeded by: Perry Christie
- In office 21 August 1992 – 3 May 2002
- Monarch: Elizabeth II
- Governors-General: Sir Clifford Darling; Sir Orville Turnquest; Dame Ivy Dumont
- Preceded by: Sir Lynden Pindling
- Succeeded by: Perry Christie

Minister of Finance of The Bahamas
- In office 4 May 2007 – 8 May 2012
- Preceded by: Perry Christie
- Succeeded by: Perry Christie
- In office 1992–1995
- Preceded by: Paul Adderley
- Succeeded by: William Clifford Allen

Personal details
- Born: Hubert Alexander Ingraham; 4 August 1947 (age 79) Pine Ridge, Bahamas
- Party: Progressive Liberal Party (1970s–1987); Independent (1987–1990); Free National Movement (1990–present)
- Spouse: Delores Miller

Hubert Alexander Ingraham, PC (born 4 August 1947) is a Bahamian politician who was Prime Minister of The Bahamas from August 1992 to May 2002, and again from May 2007 to May 2012. He is a member of the Free National Movement Party (FNM). Prior to the 2012 election, he was the FNM's Party Leader and member of Parliament for the North Abaco constituency. He served as leader of the opposition in the House of Assembly of The Bahamas from 2005 to 2007.

In the historic election of August 1992, in which the FNM unseated the Progressive Liberal Party (PLP), Ingraham succeeded Prime Minister Lynden Pindling, who had headed the PLP government for quarter of a century, since January 1967. Following his party's victory in the May 2007 election, he became prime minister again.

After his government was defeated in the 2012 general election, on 7 May Ingraham announced his resignation as FNM leader and as an MP.

== Youth and early career ==
Ingraham was born 4 August 1947 in Pine Ridge, Grand Bahama. He is the son of Jerome Ingraham, a stevedore, and Isabella La-Roda (née Cornish). He grew up in Coopers Town, Abaco and began his education at Coopers Town Public School, later attending the Southern Senior School and the Government High School Evening Institute in Nassau.

Ingraham studied law in Nassau. He was called to the Bahamas Bar in December 1972 and eventually became senior partner in the law firm of Christie, Ingraham and Co. He entered front-line politics in 1975, when he was elected to the National General Council of the then ruling Progressive Liberal Party. He previously served as a member of the Air Transport Licensing Authority and Chairman of the Real Property Tax Tribunal.

Following brief employment in the accounting departments of Owens-Illinois Sugar Mill Company in Abaco and The Bahamas Telecommunications Corporation and the Chase Manhattan Bank in Nassau, Ingraham became an articled law clerk in the Chambers of McKinney Bancroft and Hughes.

== Cabinet Minister ==
In 1976, Ingraham was elected National Chairman of the Progressive Liberal Party (PLP) and a member of that party's National Executive Committee. In 1977, still Chairman of the PLP, he was elected to the House of Assembly. In Parliament, Ingraham served as a member of the Standing Committee on Privilege and Public Accounts, and as Chairman of an investigative Select Committee on Influence Peddling and Political Contributions.

He was re-elected to Parliament in the General Election of June 1982, and appointed Minister of Housing and National Insurance (1982-1984). In 1982, he also became Chairman of The Bahamas Mortgage Corporation, an institution established to secure and guarantee housing financing for Bahamians in need of that service.

== Opposition ==
Ingraham stood as an independent candidate in the 1987 general election and was one of only two Members of Parliament expelled from the ruling PLP to have gone on to immediate re-election as an independent.

Ingraham joined the Official Opposition in April 1990, and was immediately appointed Parliamentary Leader. When the Leader of the Opposition, Sir Cecil Wallace-Whitfield, died in May 1990, Ingraham was unanimously elected Leader of the Free National Movement and was appointed leader of the opposition on 18 May 1990, by Sir Henry Milton Taylor, the Governor-General. In June 1990, as freshman Leader of the Free National Movement, he led his party to a Marco City, Grand Bahama, by-election victory over the governing party. In the general election of 19 August 1992, Ingraham led the Free National Movement to a stunning 32–17 victory over the Progressive Liberal Party, and thus ended the 25-year hold on power of Prime Minister Sir Lynden Pindling.

== Prime minister ==
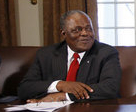
Prime Minister Hubert Ingraham at the White House

The new prime minister had Cabinet responsibility for the Ministry of Finance from 1992 to 1995. Later, in a streamlined Cabinet, he took on responsibility for trade and industry, and quickly established a one-stop Investment Authority that promoted fresh investment in The Bahamas. In July 1993, Prime Minister Ingraham was appointed a member of Her Majesty's Most Honourable Privy Council. Again on 14 March 1997, Ingraham led the FNM to an even greater election victory.

Ingraham pledged that he would serve no longer than two terms or 10 years as Head of Government. In 2001, the FNM held special elections for Leader-Designate and Deputy Leader-Designate of the Party, with Tommy Turnquest emerging as the victor who would assume leadership of the FNM on the night of the next general elections.

=== Administrative achievements ===
He is credited for allowing the Atlantis Paradise Island project to develop.

He administered a disengagement of the Bahamas Telecommunications Company in the mid-1990s, severing ties with hundreds of BTC employees, although handing out severance packages for those who opted for the exit packages. The true value of the impact of the disengagement is debatable.

Through his first term, he guided the Bahamas through a tumultuous period in the financial services sector, which ushered in sweeping changes to be made and imposed upon the Bahamas by international organizations such as the OECD and the FATF. Sweeping legislation was seen as necessary by the administration, but such drastic and immediate measures were up to debate by observers and economists of the time. Subsequently, the market fears spread and resulted in massive job losses in the sector.

By the end of his first term, he was sitting on a Bahamian economy which was going into recession, brought on by a global downturn in productivity, sparked by the dot.com bubble bust and the attacks of 9–11, exacerbated by massive exits of foreign capital, due to new banking regulations set in place by his administration.

Another controversial issue proposed by his administration was a referendum on social policy. Some observers said that the failure of the referendum led to the resounding defeat at the polls for the FNM in 2002, with a 29–7 overwhelming margin of victory for the incoming Progressive Liberal Party.

== Return to the opposition ==
In 2001, Ingraham announced his decision to step down as party leader and Tommy Turnquest, a member of his Cabinet, emerged from the resultant leadership contest as the party's new leader. However, in the 2002 General Election, the party suffered a resounding defeat at the polls with his leader designate and deputy designate losing their seats in parliament.

Although Ingraham retained his North Abaco seat, he did not immediately return to party leadership, as Leader of the Opposition nor of house business. It was not until the party's November 2005 convention that he was again elected FNM Leader, amid criticism for the lack of due process in his ability, through the party's platform, to make himself eligible for party nomination. This was also seen as a repudiation of his former position, where he claimed to only want to serve two terms as prime minister. Nonetheless, he was returned to party leadership ahead of the 2007 general elections.

At the time, Ingraham said that it boiled down to a matter of trust. "The country needs and deserves reform no matter what, because the loss of trust in government has been so great." And he maintained that the FNM had developed an agenda to renew the people's trust in government.

He says national leadership by the Free National Movement will once again bring the interests of Bahamians into focus and to the forefront of government's social and economic policies, remove influence peddling from the halls of government, restore integrity and honesty to public life, and reintroduce initiatives to achieve efficient and effective government left in abeyance during the last four and a half years.

== Prime Minister again ==
In the general election held on 2 May 2007, the FNM won a majority of seats, defeating the PLP, and Ingraham was sworn in as prime minister on 4 May. He became Minister of Finance in the new government.

As a result of his government's defeat in the May 2012 general election, Ingraham announced his resignation as FNM leader and as an MP; his resignation was to take effect on 26 May 2012. On 9 May 2012, Hubert Minnis was elected by the members of the FNM to succeed Ingraham as Leader of the Opposition.

Political offices
Preceded by Lynden Pindling	Prime Minister of the Bahamas; 1992–2002	Succeeded by Perry Christie
Preceded by Perry Christie	Prime Minister of the Bahamas; 2007–2012	Succeeded by Perry Christie
