= Marguerite Pindling =

Bahamian politician (born 1932)

The Most Honourable Dame Marguerite Pindling ON GCMG
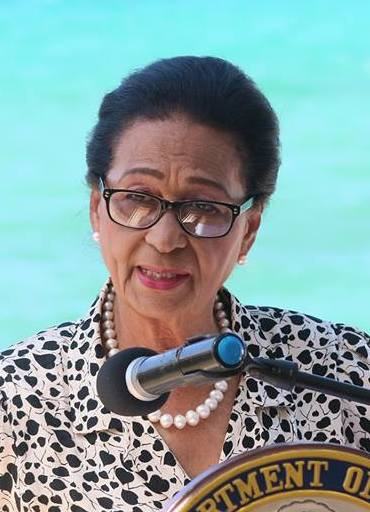
- Pindling in 2017

10th Governor-General of the Bahamas
- In office 8 July 2014 – 28 June 2019
- Monarch: Elizabeth II
- Prime Minister: Perry Christie; Hubert Minnis
- Preceded by: Arthur Foulkes
- Succeeded by: Cornelius A. Smith

Personal details
- Born: Marguerite Matilda McKenzie; 26 June 1932 (age 93) Long Bay Cay, Bahamas
- Spouse: Sir Lynden Pindling (m. 1956; died 2000)
- Children: 4

Dame Marguerite Pindling, Lady Pindling, ON GCMG (née McKenzie; born 26 June 1932) is a former diplomat who served as the tenth governor-general of the Bahamas, from 8 July 2014 to 28 June 2019. She is the second female governor-general of the Bahamas after Dame Ivy Dumont.

She was married to Sir Lynden Pindling, the first Prime Minister of The Bahamas. The couple had four children.

== Early and personal life ==
Marguerite McKenzie was born to Reuben and Viola McKenzie in South Andros on 26 June 1932. She moved to Nassau in 1946 to live with her sister and attended the Western Senior School. She left her schooling at the age of 14. She later became an assistant to photographer Stanley Toogood, and later worked with Colyn Rees.

Soon after, she met Lynden Pindling, who would go on to become the first black Premier of the colony of the Bahama Islands (second Premier to Sir Roland Symonette) from 1967 to 1969, then the first and longest serving Prime Minister of the Bahamas from 1969 to 1992. The couple married on 5 May 1956 and remained married until his death on 26 August 2000. The couple had four children: Obafemi Pindling, Leslie Pindling, Monique Johnson, and Michelle Sands.

== Career ==
Between 1976 and 1991 she served as chairperson of the Fundraising Committee of the Bahamas Red Cross Society, and was in June 2012 sworn in as Deputy to the Governor-General before taking on the post of Governor-General. From July 2014 to June 2019 she was governor-general of the Bahamas.

== Honours and awards ==
She was appointed Dame Grand Cross of the Order of St Michael and St George in 2014. In August 2018 she was designated Chancellor of the Societies of Honour.

Government offices
Preceded by Sir Arthur Foulkes	Governor-General of the Bahamas; 2014–2019	Succeeded by Sir Cornelius A. Smith
