= Central Bank of the Bahamas =

Central Bank of The Bahamas

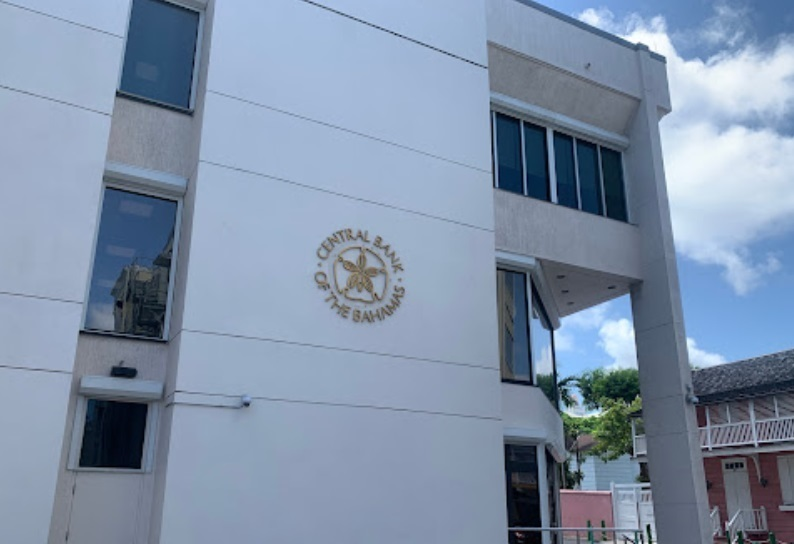
- Entrance of the bank in Nassau.
- Central bank of: The Bahamas
- Headquarters: Nassau
- Coordinates: 25.0765°N 77.3435°W
- Established: 1 June 1974; 52 years ago
- Ownership: 100% state ownership
- Governor: John A Rolle
- Currency: Bahamian dollar BSD (ISO 4217)
- Reserves: 810 million USD
- Preceded by: Board of Commissioners of Currency (1919-58); Bahamas Monetary Authority (1968-74)
- Website: www.centralbankbahamas.com

The Central Bank of The Bahamas is the reserve bank of The Bahamas based in the capital Nassau.

The bank was established on 1 June 1974 but traces its origins to the currency board established in 1919. The bank carries out the independent monetary policy and supervision of the financial sector of The Bahamas.

== History ==
=== Currency Board ===
In 1919, the British Government established the Board of Commissioners of Currency to issue local Bahamian currency pegged to the pound sterling. The Board helped promote the Bahamas' emergence as an international currency trading and banking center during the 1960s and 70s.

By December 1967, there were 208 banks and trust companies in the Bahamas, up from only 37 in 1963. By 1974, there were 323. However, the legislative framework was inadequate to provide for the proper regulation and supervision of banking activities.

=== Monetary Authority ===
In 1968, the Bahamas Monetary Authority (BMA) was created in the board's place. The government also subsequently ended the Bahamian dollar's pegging to the pound and pegged it instead to the US dollar.

The Authority had an expanded role in the financial system of the Bahamas. First, the BMA operated under a centralized system, under which it would buy and sell foreign exchange. This allowed banks to place their foreign reserves under the control of the BMA, effectively eliminating their foreign exchange risk. Second, the BMA was authorized to purchase Bahamian government debt marking the beginning of a discretionary monetary policy. Finally, the BMA was authorized to serve as a lender of last resort to the commercial banks in the event of a financial emergency.

The BMA was, however, short-lived and was replaced in 1974 by the Central Bank of The Bahamas.

=== Central Bank ===
The Central Bank was established on 1 June 1974 by The Central Bank of The Bahamas Act. now superseded by the Central Bank of The Bahamas Act, 2000.

The new bank's mandate included:

- the power to promote and maintain monetary stability and credit and balance of payments conditions conducive to the orderly development of the Bahamian economy;
- to promote and maintain adequate banking services and high standards of conduct and bank management;
- to advise the Minister of Finance, on request, on any financial or monetary matter.

In addition, the Central Bank is the sole issuer of notes and coins, it acts as a banker and adviser to the Government, and manages the Government's debt. It is also a banker and lender of last resort to the commercial banks. The Bahamas is a member of the International Monetary Fund (IMF), allowing it to apply exchange control to capital account transactions, foreign equity investments, direct foreign investment, and other inward and outward flows of money.

=== Digital Currency ===
In October 2020, the central bank released its digital currency called the Sand dollar, the digital version of the Bahamian dollar.

== Responsibilities ==
The responsibilities of the Central Bank are to foster an environment of monetary stability conducive to economic development and to ensure a stable and sound financial system. It achieves this goal by:

- performing the traditional roles of issuing legal tender;
- maintaining external value of the Bahamian dollar;
- promoting monetary stability and a sound financial structure;
- acting as a banker and advisor to the government;
- compiling financial statistics.

== Leadership ==
=== Governors ===
The current Governor of the Central Bank is John A Rolle, who has held the position since January 2016.

Previous Governors include:

- Timothy Donaldson, 1974–1980
- William C. Allen, 1980–1987
- James H. Smith, 1987–1997
- Julian W. Francis, 1997–2005
- Wendy M. Craigg, 2005–2015

=== Board of directors ===
Current board members include:

- John A Rolle, Governor
- Derek S. Rolle, Deputy Governor
- Robert Adams
- Thomas Dean
- Russel Miller

== See also ==
- Antonius Roberts, curator of Bank's art gallery
- Ministry of Finance (Bahamas)
- Bahamian dollar
- List of central banks
- List of financial supervisory authorities by country
