= Stafford Sands =

Minister of Finance of the Bahamas

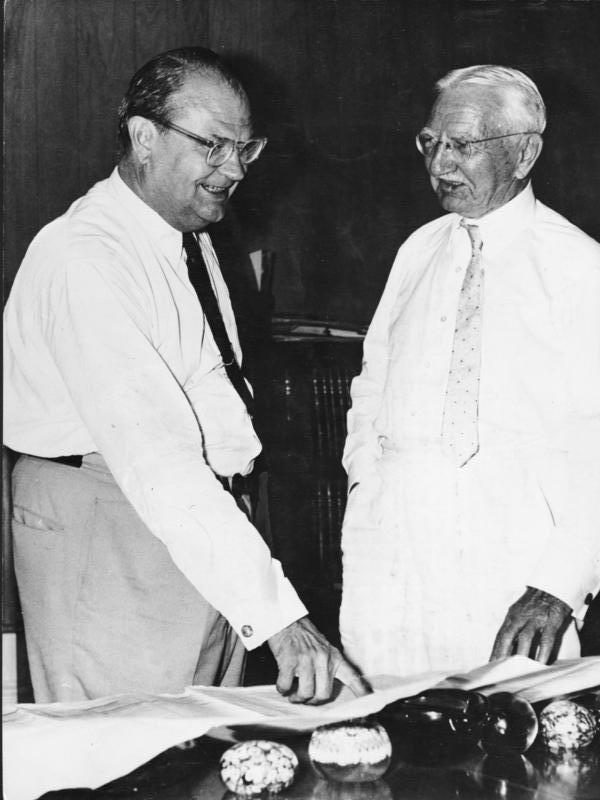
- Stafford Sands (left) and Hjalmar Schacht in October 1962

Minister of Finance of the Bahamas
- In office 1964–1967
- Succeeded by: Carlton Francis
- Prime Minister: Sir Roland Symonette

Personal details
- Born: 23 September 1913 Nassau, New Providence, The Bahamas
- Died: 23 January 1972 (aged 58) London, England
- Party: United Bahamian Party

Sir Stafford Lofthouse Sands (23 September 1913 – January 23, 1972) was a former Minister of Finance of the Bahamas (1964–1967), who held other high positions in the islands until his self-chosen exile in 1967. Hailed as Father of Tourism, he succumbed to corruption, allowing organized crime to unfold activities like money laundering and to establish offshore banking on the Bahamas.

== Early life and education ==
Stafford Lofthouse Sands was born in 1913 to Stafford Sands and Enid Rosalie Lofthouse. The elder Sands was founder of City Meat Markets after his stint with the Caribbean operations of the Bank of Canada. Sands was the grandson of Sir James Patrick Sands, a businessman who was a Member of the House of Assembly and the President of the Legislative Council.

== Career ==
Sands was admitted to the bar in 1935.

From 1946, he represented Wallace Groves and other Americans who sought to establish casinos, resorts, free-trade areas, and other developments in the islands, primarily at Freeport on largely undeveloped Grand Bahama island. Gambling was not allowed at the time, but through corruption there was a change in the law and the already built casino in the Lucayan Beach Hotel was legalized. Sands officially was the director of the casino, but others like Meyer Lansky, a Jewish mobster was the unofficial director. A key development was the introduction of the Eurodollar by which the mafia could transfer money from the US via the Bahamas to Europe.

From 1958, when party politics began, Sands had a prominent role in the United Bahamian Party (UBP), which was in power until 1967. The 1967 Royal Commission of Inquiry reported that Sands and the UBP received large payments, represented by Groves as "consulting fees," from the casino interests.

== Personal life and death ==
Sands permanently left the Bahama islands for exile in Spain, along with his considerable fortune. He sold all his holdings, including his "Waterloo" estate on Nassau's East Bay Street and his father's interests in the City Market supermarket chain to Winn-Dixie.

He died at a London hospital of bone cancer after 4 months in hospital. He was 58. He was survived by his second wife, Ulla, Lady Sands and one daughter.

== Legacy ==
He is credited with being an architect of Bahamian post-war prosperity and has been dubbed the "Father of Tourism" in The Bahamas. He allowed organized crime to unfold activities like money laundering and helped establish offshore banking on the Bahamas.

His portrait appeared on the 10 Bahamian dollar note from 2001 until 2005, and again since 2010, while it was replaced by that of Queen Elizabeth II.
