= Cornelius A. Smith =

Bahamian politician (born 1937)

The Most Honourable Sir Cornelius Smith ON GCMG
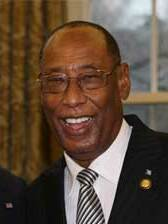
- Smith in 2008

11th Governor-General of The Bahamas
- In office 28 June 2019 – 31 August 2023
- Monarchs: Elizabeth II; Charles III
- Prime Minister: Hubert Minnis; Philip Davis
- Preceded by: Marguerite Pindling
- Succeeded by: Cynthia A. Pratt

Personal details
- Born: Cornelius Alvin Smith; 7 April 1937 (age 89) North Long Island, Bahamas
- Party: Free National Movement
- Spouse: Clara Elizabeth Knowles
- Children: 3
- Education: University of Miami

Sir Cornelius Alvin Smith GCMG ON (born 7 April 1937) is a Bahamian politician and diplomat, who served as the 11th Governor-General of the Bahamas from 2019 to 2023.

== Biography ==
Smith was one of the first members of the Free National Movement upon its foundation in the early 1970s, and served in the legislature representing Pineridge constituency in Grand Bahama, starting in 1982, and was re-elected three times. Smith served as the Minister of Education from 1992 to 1995, Minister of Public Safety and Immigration from 1995 to 1997, Minister of Tourism from 1997 to 2000, and Minister of Transport and Local Government from 2000 to 2002.

He also previously was Ambassador to the United States, starting on his appointment on 24 September 2007, as well as Ambassador/Permanent Representative to the Organization of American States and Non-Resident Ambassador to Mexico, Malaysia, Colombia, Panama, Costa Rica, El Salvador, Guatemala, Honduras and Nicaragua.

In 2018, Smith was sworn in as the deputy Governor General.

On 17 June 2019, he was announced as the 11th Governor-General of the Bahamas, taking up office on 28 June, in succession to Dame Marguerite Pindling, who had served in the position since 8 July 2014.

In December 2019, Smith was the recipient of the Nassau Pan Hellenic Lifetime Achievement Award for his philanthropic contributions to The Bahamas.

Smith demitted the viceregal office on 31 August 2023.

== Personal life ==
Cornelius Alvin Smith was born to Sylvanues and Susan Smith in North End, Long Island, Bahamas, on 7 April 1937. He received his primary education at Glintons Public School, Long Island, and his secondary education at the Bahamas Teachers Training College at Nassau, subsequently earning a master's degree in business administration from the University of Miami.

Smith is married to the former Clara Elizabeth Knowles, with whom he has three children.

Government offices
Preceded by Dame Marguerite Pindling	Governor-General of The Bahamas; 2019–2023	Succeeded by Dame Cynthia A. Pratt
