= Paul Adderley =

Bahamian politician (1928–2012)

Acting Governor-General of the Bahamas
- In office 1 December 2005 – 1 February 2006
- Monarch: Elizabeth II
- Prime Minister: Perry Christie
- Preceded by: Dame Ivy Dumont
- Succeeded by: A. D. Hanna

Minister of Finance of the Bahamas
- In office 1990–1992
- Prime Minister: Lynden Pindling
- Preceded by: Lynden Pindling
- Succeeded by: Hubert Ingraham

Personal details
- Born: 15 August 1928 Nassau, Bahamas
- Died: 19 September 2012 (aged 84) Bahamas
- Party: National Development Party

Paul Lawrence Adderley (15 August 1928 – 19 September 2012) was a Bahamian politician and lawyer. He was the longest serving Attorney-General of the 20th century, holding the post for 17 years (1973–1989).

== Career ==
Adderley was originally a member of the Progressive Liberal Party (PLP) under Lynden Oscar Pindling. However, Adderley left the PLP in 1965 and established the National Development Party (NDP) political party. He returned to the PLP shortly before the Bahamas achieved independence from the United Kingdom in 1973.

On 1 March 1973, he was appointed Minister of External Affairs and on 10 July 1973 became the country's first and, ultimately, longest-serving Attorney-General. One day after his change from the ministry of foreign affairs to the ministry of education, he nonetheless held the Bahamian speech in the UN general debate on 10 October 1984 instead of his successor Clement T. Maynard.

Adderley served as Minister of Education from 1984 to 1990. He served as Minister of National Security from 1987 to 1992. He was then appointed as the Minister of Finance from 1990 to 1992.

Adderley served as acting Governor-General of the Bahamas from 1 December 2005 until 1 February 2006.

Adderley retired from politics, remaining an active attorney as of 2010. In September 2010, he appeared in the documentary film On the Wings of Men, about Lynden Oscar Pindling, by Bahamian filmmaker Calvin Harris.

== Death and legacy ==
Adderley died on 19 September 2012, aged 84, and was given a state funeral on 28 September.

At a ceremony on 27 June 2014, the building housing the Office of the Attorney General (OAG) and the Ministry of Legal Affairs was named in honour of Paul L. Adderley.

Government offices
Preceded by Ivy Dumont	Governor-General of the Bahamas; 2005–2006	Succeeded by Arthur Dion Hanna
