= Perry Christie =

Bahamian politician (born 1943)

The Right Honourable Perry Gladstone Christie
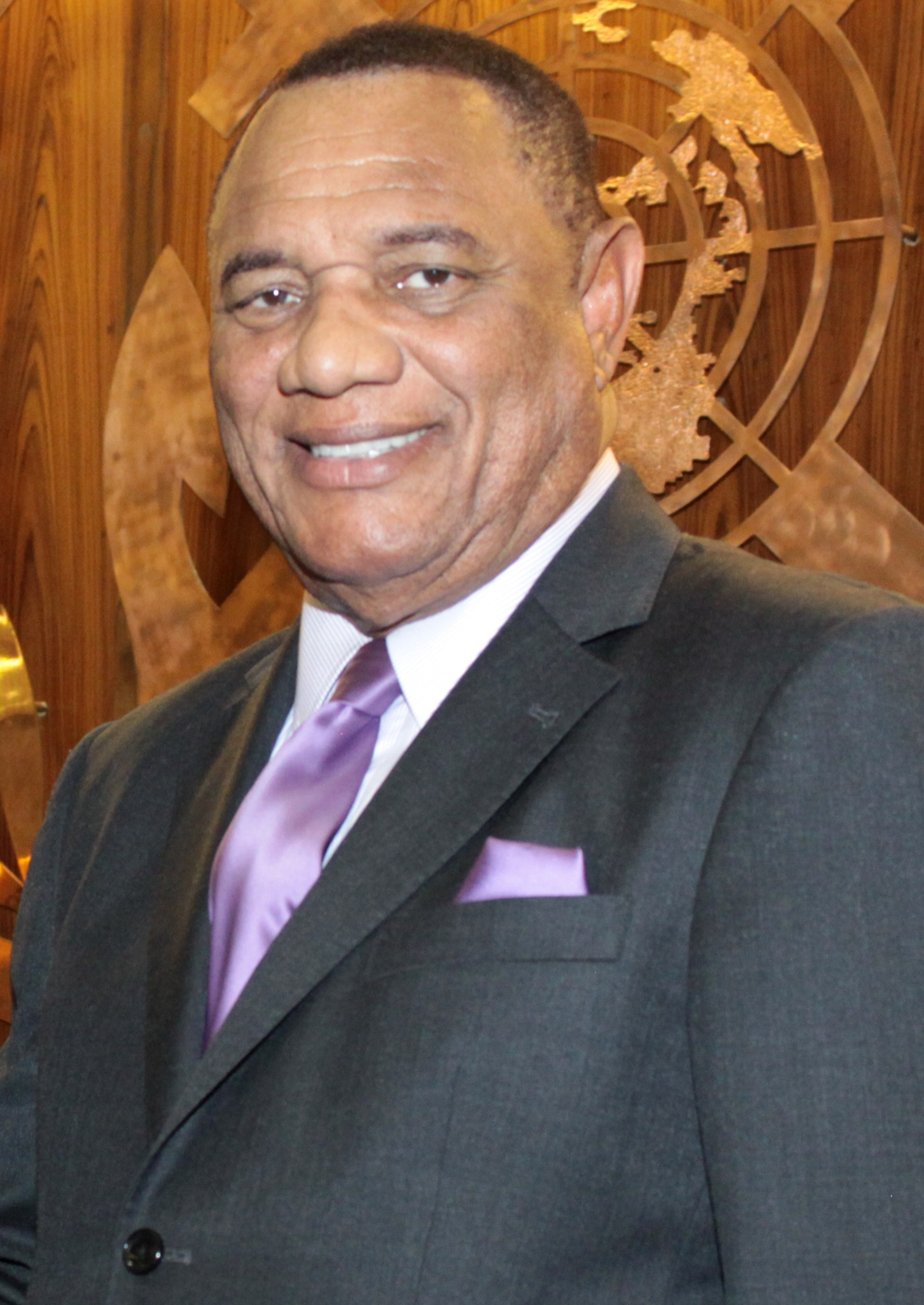
- Christie in 2013

3rd Prime Minister of the Bahamas
- In office 8 May 2012 – 11 May 2017
- Monarch: Elizabeth II
- Governors General: Arthur Foulkes; Marguerite Pindling
- Deputy: Philip Davis
- Preceded by: Hubert Ingraham
- Succeeded by: Hubert Minnis
- In office 6 June 2005 – 4 May 2007
- Monarch: Elizabeth II
- Governors General: Ivy Dumont; Paul Adderley (acting); Arthur Dion Hanna
- Deputy: Cynthia A. Pratt
- Preceded by: Cynthia A. Pratt (acting)
- Succeeded by: Hubert Ingraham
- In office 3 May 2002 – 4 May 2005
- Monarch: Elizabeth II
- Governor General: Ivy Dumont
- Deputy: Cynthia A. Pratt
- Preceded by: Hubert Ingraham
- Succeeded by: Cynthia A. Pratt (acting)

Minister of Finance of the Bahamas
- In office 2002–2007
- Preceded by: William Clifford Allen
- Succeeded by: Hubert Ingraham
- In office 2012–2017
- Preceded by: Hubert Ingraham
- Succeeded by: Peter Turnquest

Personal details
- Born: Perry Gladstone Christie; 21 August 1943 (age 83) Nassau, Bahamas
- Party: PLP
- Spouse: Bernadette Hanna
- Education: University of Birmingham; City Law School

Perry Gladstone Christie PC, MP (born 21 August 1943) is a Bahamian former politician who served as prime minister of the Bahamas from 2002 to 2007 and from 2012 to 2017. He is the second longest-serving Bahamian elected parliamentarian (behind Sir Roland Symonette who was first elected to parliament in 1925 and served until 1977), representing the Centreville constituency from 1977 to 2017. He is also a former athlete. His Progressive Liberal Party is the oldest Bahamian political party, holding solid majorities in the Bahamian Parliament several times in its long history.

== Political career ==
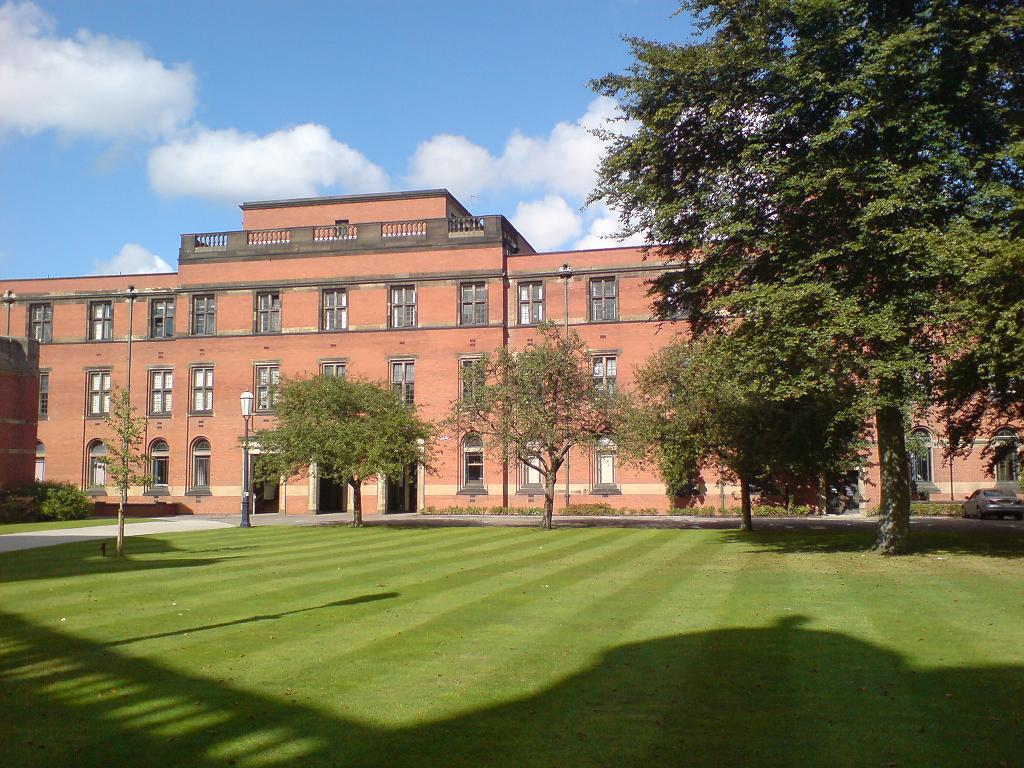
The University of Birmingham

Christie is believed to have been the youngest Bahamian ever appointed to the Senate. Named as a Senator by Prime Minister Lynden Pindling in November 1974, Christie served in that capacity until June 1977 and continued to be a protege of his. In January 1977 he was appointed chairman of the Gaming Board, which regulates casinos in The Bahamas.

Receiving the PLP nomination for the Centreville constituency in the 1977 general election, Christie was elected Member of Parliament for that constituency, and shortly afterward appointed Minister of Health and National Insurance, and held that position until 1982. During the June 1982 general election, he was re-elected Member of Parliament for Centreville, and was once again appointed to the Prime Minister's Cabinet, but as Minister of Tourism.

In 1984, however, he was dismissed from the cabinet, and during the 1987 general election ran as an independent candidate. He retained his seat in the Centreville constituency. Three years later – in March 1990 – Christie returned to the Progressive Liberal Party, and was appointed minister of agriculture, trade and industry by the prime minister. Christie's ministerial responsibilities included the ministry of agriculture, trade and industry; mining, geological surveys, petroleum, fuel, oils and petrochemicals, industries encouragement, manufacturing, relations with The Bahamas Agricultural and Industrial Corporation, relations with The Bahamas National Trust, Andros reef and blue holes, and the Department of Agriculture, Fisheries and Co-operatives.

By 1992, Christie and the PLP had begun a relationship with Peter Nygard, supporting each other until at least 2017. In a 2021 CBC News article, Christie denied there being any inappropriate behavior on his part in that relationship.

In January 1993, following the PLP's defeat in the August 1992 general election, Christie was elected co-deputy leader of the PLP with responsibility for party activities outside parliament. Victorious in the newly created Farm Road constituency in the general election, he was elected leader of the PLP at a special convention on 5 April 1997 and appointed as leader of the opposition by the Governor-General on 7 April. Christie succeeded Lynden Pindling, who had led the PLP since 1956.

=== 2002-2007 ===
Perry served as Prime Minister from 2002-2007. He also served as the Minister of finance.

=== Events since 2007 ===
Christie's party, the Progressive Liberal Party (PLP), was defeated in the May 2007 general election, taking 18 seats against 23 for the Free National Movement (FNM), and Christie conceded defeat in a phone call to FNM leader Hubert Ingraham. After the new FNM government was sworn in, Christie was sworn in as leader of the opposition.

In November 2009, Christie was elected, and returned as Leader of the PLP at its Annual General Convention, garnering more than 80% of the vote over Dr. Bernard Nottage.

Christie was re-elected as Prime Minister of the Bahamas on 7 May 2012. He had campaigned in support of oil exploration and received a boost from 15% unemployment and rising crime rates. He continued serving as minister of finance as well.

Christie has brought programmes like Urban Renewal.

Christie also introduced Value Added Tax at a rate of 7.5%. The money raised from VAT was slated to pay off National Debt.

In 2014, Christie was inducted into the International Civil Rights Walk of Fame, becoming the fourth person from the Bahamas inducted.

Multiple human rights violations have been investigated under his leadership, none of which have been solved as of 2015 according to Tribune 242. In March 2015, that the Prime Minister expressed frustration with the media while navigating these controversies.

=== 10 May 2017 General Elections ===
After a victory by the Free National Movement (FNM), the PLP was defeated in the 10 May 2017 general elections with the FNM winning 35 seats, and the PLP winning only 4 seats. Allegations of corruption and high unemployment were central themes in the campaign, along with hostility towards journalists and the Fyre Festival. The win also resulted in the unseating of Perry Christie from his Centerville seat by a mere four votes, a constituency which he had represented for 40 consecutive years.

== Cabinet members (2012–2017) ==
Name	Position	Date of appointment
Perry Christie	Prime Minister and Minister of Finance	8 May 2012
Philip Davis	Deputy Prime Minister and Minister of Works and Urban Development	9 May 2012
Frederick A. Mitchell	Minister of Foreign Affairs and Immigration	10 May 2012
Glenys Hanna Martin	Minister of Transport and Aviation	10 May 2012
Melanie Griffin	Minister of Social Services and Community Development	10 May 2012
Michael Darville	Minister for Grand Bahama	10 May 2012
Perry Gomez	Ministry of Health and Social Development	10 May 2012
Kenred Dorsett	Minister of the Environment and Housing	10 May 2012
Daniel Johnson	Minister of Youth Sports and Culture	10 May 2012
Ryan Pinder	Minister of Financial Services	10 May 2012
Jerome Fitzgerald	Minister of Education, Science, and Technology	10 May 2012
Shane D. Gibson	Minister of Labour and National Insurance	10 May 2012
V. Alfred Gray	Minister of Agriculture, Marine Resources, and Local Government	10 May 2012
Z. C. Allyson Maynard Gibson	Attorney General, Minister of Legal Affairs	10 May 2012
Bernard J. Nottage	Minister of National Security	10 May 2012
Obediah Wilchombe	Minister of Tourism	10 May 2012

Political offices
Preceded by Hubert Ingraham	Prime Minister of the Bahamas; 2002–2005	Succeeded by Cynthia Pratt; Acting
Preceded by Cynthia Pratt; Acting	Prime Minister of the Bahamas; 2005–2007	Succeeded by Hubert Ingraham
Preceded by Hubert Ingraham	Prime Minister of the Bahamas; 2012–2017	Succeeded by Hubert Minnis
