= Arthur Dion Hanna =

Bahamian politician (1928–2021)

The Most Honourable A.D. Hanna ON
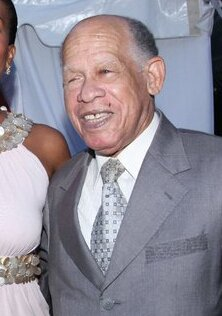
- Arthur Dion Hanna in 2011

8th Governor-General of the Bahamas
- In office 1 February 2006 – 14 April 2010
- Monarch: Elizabeth II
- Prime Minister: Perry Christie; Hubert Ingraham
- Preceded by: Paul Adderley (acting)
- Succeeded by: Sir Arthur Foulkes

Deputy Prime Minister of the Bahamas
- In office 20 February 1968 – 1984
- Prime Minister: Lynden Pindling
- Succeeded by: Clement T. Maynard

Minister of Finance of the Bahamas
- In office 1973–1984
- Prime Minister: Lynden Pindling
- Preceded by: Carlton Francis
- Succeeded by: Lynden Pindling

Personal details
- Born: 7 March 1928 Acklins Island, Bahamas
- Died: 3 August 2021 (aged 93) Nassau, Bahamas
- Party: Progressive Liberal Party

Arthur Dion Hanna (7 March 1928 – 3 August 2021) was a Bahamian politician who served as the eighth governor-general of the Bahamas from 2006 to 2010.

== Early life ==
A. D. Hanna was born on 7 March 1928. His family moved to Hope Town, Elbow Cay, Abaco, Bahamas where his father was a lighthouse keeper for the famous red and white candy-striped lighthouse.

Despite the population of Hope Town being predominantly white, as the island was settled by British Loyalists banished from the American colonies after the American Revolution, Hanna attended school and received his education in a one-room schoolhouse like everyone else during this time period. Black, white, or mixed race like Arthur Dion Hanna, no one was refused an education. From there, he moved to Nassau and became involved in politics.

== Political career ==
Hanna was active in Bahamian politics since the 1950s. As a member of the Progressive Liberal Party, Hanna represented the Ann's Town, Nassau constituency as an MP in the Bahamas' House of Assembly from 1960 to 1992.

During this time, Hanna assumed a number of important cabinet posts, including Minister of Education (1967-1968). He was appointed Deputy Prime Minister from 20 February 1968 to 1984, and Minister of Finance from 1973 to 1984.

In 1984, Hanna resigned his post as deputy prime minister in protest at the retention by Prime Minister Sir Lynden Pindling of cabinet colleagues who were heavily criticised by a Royal Commission of Enquiry of that same year. The commission was established to investigate claims of high-level corruption allegedly linked to the flourishing drugs trade of the 1980s. His resignation came within a week of the firing from the Cabinet of Hubert Ingraham and Perry Christie, who also were said to have taken a strong stand against the presence in the cabinet of ministers tarnished by the commission and who both later served successive terms as prime minister.

On 1 February 2006, Hanna was appointed Governor General of the Bahamas by Queen Elizabeth II, Queen of Bahamas, on the advice of Prime Minister Perry Christie. He retired on 14 April 2010 and was succeeded by Sir Arthur Foulkes. His daughter, Glenys, became an MP for Englerston.

In 2014, the first Legend-class patrol boat of the Royal Bahamas Defence Force was commissioned as HMBS Arthur Dion Hanna. He died on 3 August 2021, at the age of 93.

== Honours ==
Despite being offered a knighthood as is customary for governors-general, Hanna refused British honours and instead advocated for a Bahamian honours system.

- Bahamas:
  - Member of the Order of the Bahamas (2018)

Government offices
Preceded by Paul Adderley; Acting	Governor General of the Bahamas; 2006–2012	Succeeded by Arthur Foulkes
