= K. Peter Turnquest =

Bahamian politician (born 1964)

The Honourable K. Peter Turnquest
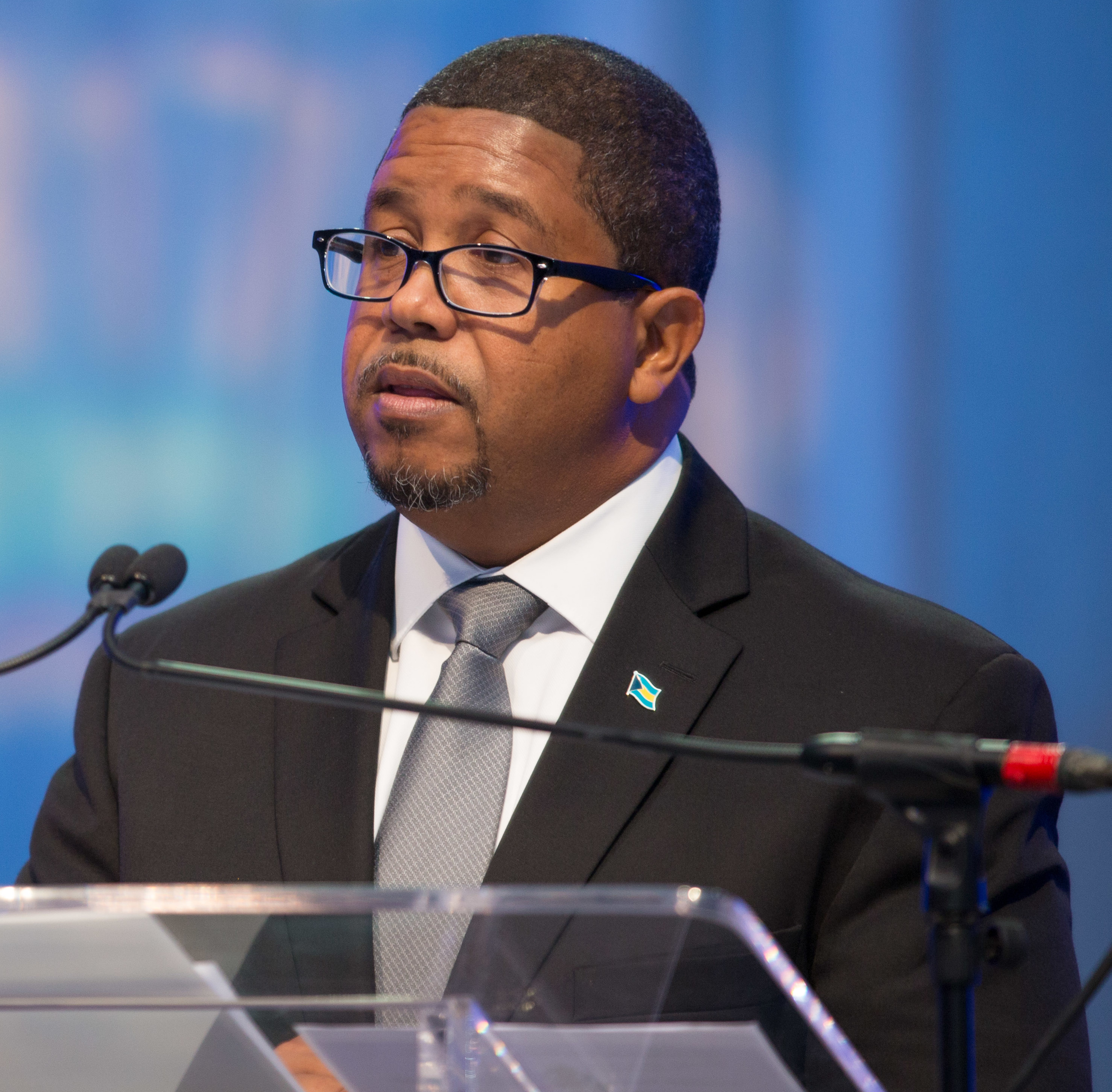

Deputy Prime Minister of the Bahamas
- In office 12 May 2017 – 25 November 2020
- Prime Minister: Hubert Minnis
- Preceded by: Brent Symonette
- Succeeded by: Desmond Bannister

Minister of Finance
- In office 15 May 2017 – 25 November 2020
- Prime Minister: Hubert Minnis
- Preceded by: Perry Christie
- Succeeded by: Hubert Minnis

Member of Parliament for East Grand Bahama
- In office May 7, 2012 – August 19, 2021

Personal details
- Born: 22 August 1964 (age 61)
- Spouse: Sonia Turnquest
- Children: 2

Kevin Peter Turnquest (born August 22, 1964) is a Bahamian politician who served as deputy prime minister and minister of finance from May 15, 2017 to November 25, 2020.

== Early life ==
Turnquest was born on August 22, 1964, in the Bahamas. He earned his Bachelor of Business Administration from Prairie View A&M University and his Master of Business Administration from Nova Southeastern University. He is a certified public accountant, and prior to entering politics he served in public and private practice in the area of financial accounting and reporting, and also led some businesses.

In 2009, he was elected the President of the Grand Bahama Chamber of Commerce. At the time of his election, he was the Chairman of the Board of SkyBahamas. He announced he would primarily focus on education and sustainability and build programs around those areas. The board held its first annual general meeting in November 2010.

== Political career ==
In the Parliament of the Bahamas he represented the East Grand Bahama constituency. He was the deputy leader of the Free National Movement. From 2017 to 2020 he served simultaneously as Minister of Finance and Deputy Prime Minister of the Bahamas. In 2018, he commented on the financial state of the Bahamas, stating that the previous administration left over $700 million in unpaid bills, a majority of which were not included in official budgets. He refused to take the Opposition's suggestion of amortizing the debts, stating it would delay payments to small Bahamian vendors.

== Legal issues ==
In April 2024, the Supreme Court of the Bahamas found that Turnquest breached his statutory fiduciary duty to Alpha Aviation Limited, but he was cleared of conspiracy to defraud since the company did not suffer measurable financial loss. The breach was related to the execution of a deed of release on a mortgage without securing payment, and the judge criticized Turnquest's lack of procedures and protections for the company's assets during the time. Turnquest stated he was solely acting on instructions from Alpha Aviation's beneficial owner, Fredrick Kaiser, and that he had approved the release.
