= Prime Minister of the Bahamas =

Head of government

Prime Minister of the Commonwealth of The Bahamas
- Seal of the prime minister of the Bahamas

- Flag of the prime minister

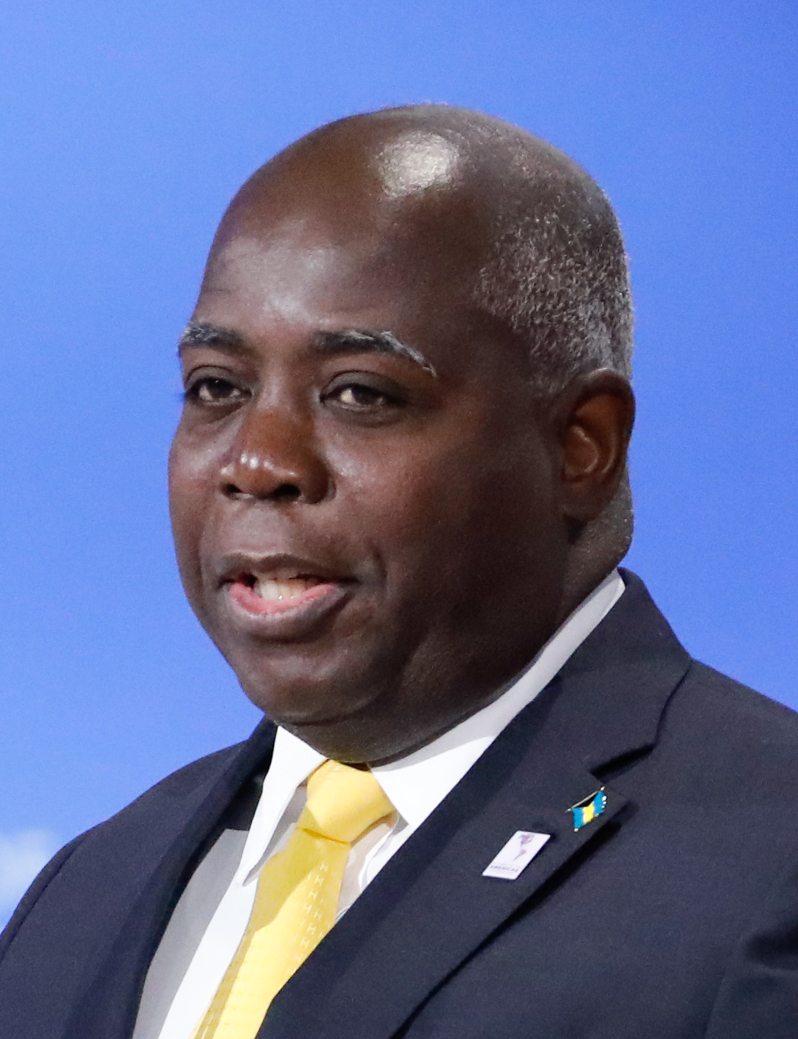
- Incumbent; Philip Davis since 17 September 2021
- Government; Cabinet
- Style: The Most Honourable
- Type: Head of government
- Abbreviation: PM
- Member of: Cabinet of the Bahamas; Parliament of the Bahamas
- Seat: Nassau
- Appointer: Governor-General
- Term length: At the governor-general's pleasure (normally 5 years)
- Precursor: Premier of the Bahamas Islands
- Inaugural holder: Sir Lynden Pindling
- Formation: 10 May 1969
- Deputy: Deputy Prime Minister of the Bahamas
- Salary: B$86,000 annually
- Website: bahamas.gov.bs

The prime minister of the Bahamas is the head of government of the Bahamas. The prime minister is formally appointed into office by the governor-general of the Bahamas, who represents Charles III, the king of the Bahamas (the Bahamian head of state).

The following article contains a list of prime ministers of the Bahamas, from the establishment of the position of chief minister of the Bahamas Islands in 1955 to the present day.

== Constitutional basis ==
Under section 72 of the Constitution of the Bahamas, the Governor-General of the Bahamas must appoint "the member of the House of Assembly who is the leader of the party which commands the support of the majority of the members of that House". In the event of a hung parliament, the governor-general should appoint the member who is "most likely to command the support of the majority of members of that House".

=== Official oath of office ===
I, _________________________, being appointed Prime Minister, do swear that I will to the best of my judgment, at all times when so required, freely give my counsel and advice to the Governor-General (or any other person for the time being lawfully performing the functions of that office) for the good management of the public affairs of the Bahamas, and I do further swear that I will not on any account, at any time whatsoever, disclose the counsel, advice, opinion or vote of any particular Minister or Parliamentary Secretary and that I will not, except with the authority of the Cabinet and to such extent as may be required for the good management of the affairs of the Bahamas, directly or indirectly reveal the business or proceedings of the Cabinet or the nature or contents of any documents communicated to me as Prime Minister or any matter coming to my knowledge in my capacity as such, and that in all things I will be a true and faithful Prime Minister. So help me God.

== Office of the Prime Minister ==
The prime minister of the Bahamas is the head of the government of the Bahamas. The duties of the prime minister include:

- Office of the Prime Minister
- Department of Lands and Surveys
- Government Printing Department
- Department of Statistics
- Bahamas Information Services
- National Economic Council
- Promotion and facilitation of investment
- Development in the Family Islands

Agencies under the prime minister include:

- Department of Lands and Surveys
- Lands and Surveying
- Acquiring Land
- Department of Local Government
- Relations with Local Government Agencies
- Local improvement associations

== List of heads of government of the Bahamas (1955–present) ==
Political parties

United Bahamian Party (UBP)
Progressive Liberal Party (PLP)
Free National Movement (FNM)

=== Chief minister of the Bahamas Islands (1955–1964) ===
No.	Portrait	Name (Birth–Death)	Election	Term of office			Political party
No.	Portrait	Name (Birth–Death)	Election	Took office	Left office	Time in office	Political party
1		Sir Roland Symonette (1898–1980)	1962	1955	7 January 1964	9 years	UBP

=== Premiers of the Bahamas Islands (1964–1969) ===
No.	Portrait	Name (Birth–Death)	Election	Term of office			Political party
No.	Portrait	Name (Birth–Death)	Election	Took office	Left office	Time in office	Political party
(1)		Sir Roland Symonette (1898–1980)	—	7 January 1964	16 January 1967	3 years, 9 days	UBP
2		Lynden Pindling (1930–2000)	1967; 1968	16 January 1967	10 May 1969	2 years, 114 days	PLP

=== Prime minister of the Commonwealth of the Bahamas Islands (1969–1973) ===
No.	Portrait	Name (Birth–Death)	Election	Term of office			Political party
No.	Portrait	Name (Birth–Death)	Election	Took office	Left office	Time in office	Political party
1		Lynden Pindling (1930–2000)	1972	10 May 1969	10 July 1973	4 years, 61 days	PLP

=== Prime ministers of the Commonwealth of the Bahamas (1973–present) ===
No.	Portrait	Name (Birth–Death)	Election	Term of office			Political party
No.	Portrait	Name (Birth–Death)	Election	Took office	Left office	Time in office	Political party
1		Lynden Pindling (1930–2000)	1977; 1982; 1987	10 July 1973	21 August 1992	19 years, 42 days	PLP
2		Hubert Ingraham (born 1947)	1992; 1997	21 August 1992	3 May 2002	9 years, 255 days	FNM
3		Perry Christie (born 1943)	2002	3 May 2002	4 May 2007	5 years, 1 day	PLP
(2)		Hubert Ingraham (born 1947)	2007	4 May 2007	8 May 2012	5 years, 4 days	FNM
(3)		Perry Christie (born 1943)	2012	8 May 2012	11 May 2017	5 years, 3 days	PLP
4		Hubert Minnis (born 1954)	2017	11 May 2017	17 September 2021	4 years, 128 days	FNM
5		Philip Davis (born 1951)	2021; 2026	17 September 2021	Incumbent	4 years, 355 days	PLP

== Timeline ==
This is a graphical lifespan timeline of the prime ministers of the Bahamas. They are listed in order of first assuming office.

The following chart lists prime ministers by lifespan (living prime ministers on the green line), with the years outside of their tenure in beige.

== Deputy prime ministers ==
The position was formally established on 20 February 1968.

- Arthur Dion "A.D" Hanna 1968–1984
- Clement T. Maynard 1985–1992
- Orville Turnquest 1992–1995
- Frank Watson 1995–2002
- Cynthia A. Pratt 2002–2007
- Brent Symonette 2007–2012
- Philip Davis 2012–2017
- Peter Turnquest 2017–2020
- Desmond Bannister 2020–2021
- Chester Cooper 2021–present

== See also ==
- List of governors of the Bahamas
- Governor-General of the Bahamas
- List of heads of state of the Bahamas
- List of prime ministers of Elizabeth II
- List of prime ministers of Charles III
- List of Commonwealth heads of government
- List of Privy Counsellors (1952–2022)
- List of Privy Counsellors (2022–present)
