= Lynden Pindling =

Bahamian politician (1930–2000)

The Right Excellent and Right Honourable Sir Lynden Pindling NH KCMG PC JP
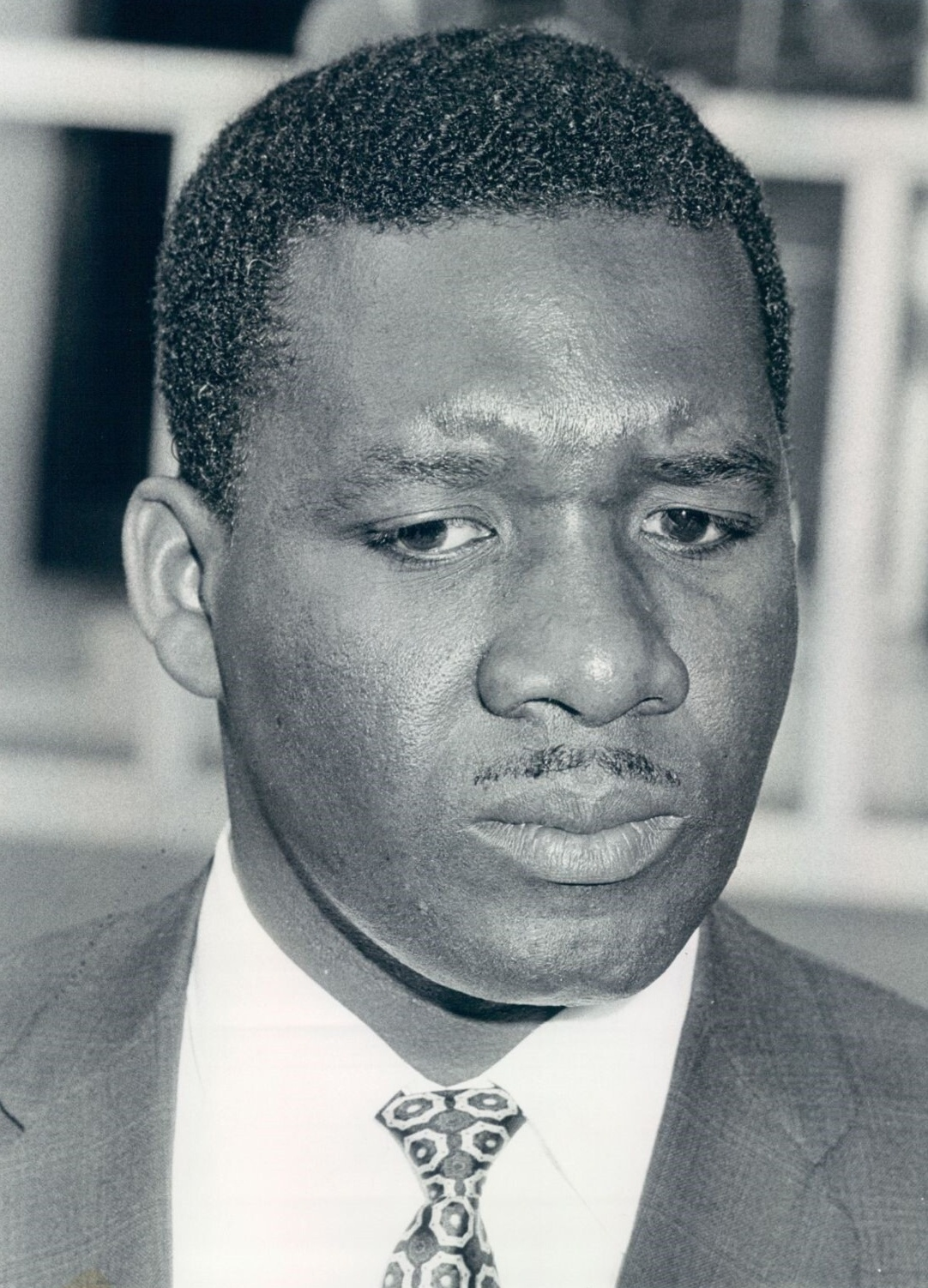
- Pindling in 1971

1st Prime Minister of the Bahamas
- In office 10 May 1969 – 21 August 1992
- Monarch: Elizabeth II
- Governors General: Sir John Paul; Sir Milo Butler; Sir Gerald Cash; Sir Henry Taylor; Sir Clifford Darling
- Preceded by: Himself as Premier
- Succeeded by: Hubert Ingraham

2nd Premier of the Bahamas
- In office 16 January 1967 – 10 May 1969
- Monarch: Elizabeth II
- Preceded by: Sir Roland Symonette
- Succeeded by: Himself as Prime Minister

Minister of Finance
- In office 1984–1990
- Prime Minister: Himself
- Preceded by: Arthur Dion Hanna
- Succeeded by: Paul Adderley

Member of Parliament
- In office June 1956 – 1967
- Constituency: New Providence South
- In office January 1967 – July 9, 1997
- Constituency: Andros-Kemp's Bay & Andros – South Andros & Mangrove Cay

Personal details
- Born: Lynden Oscar Pindling; 22 March 1930 Nassau, Bahamas, British West Indies
- Died: 26 August 2000 (aged 70) Nassau, Bahamas
- Party: Progressive Liberal
- Spouse: Marguerite McKenzie
- Children: 4
- Education: King's College London

Sir Lynden Oscar Pindling, (22 March 1930 – 26 August 2000) was a Bahamian politician who was the first prime minister of the Bahamas from 1973 to 1992. Pindling is regarded by some as the "Father of the Nation", having led the Bahamas to majority rule and independence.

Pindling served as the first black colonial premier of the Bahamas from 1967 to 1969, being the second and final officeholder. He was leader of the Progressive Liberal Party (PLP) from 1956 to 1997 when he resigned from public life under scandal. Pindling won an unbroken string of general elections until 1992, when the PLP lost to the Free National Movement (FNM) led by Hubert Alexander Ingraham. He conceded defeat with the words: "the people of this great little democracy have spoken in a most dignified and eloquent manner and the voice of the people, is the voice of God".

== Early life and family ==
Pindling was born on 22 March 1930 to Arnold and Viola (née Bain) Pindling in his grandfather's home in Mason's Addition, Nassau.

Pindling's father was a native of Jamaica who had immigrated to the Bahamas to join the Royal Bahamas Police Force as a constable. His father was also a shopkeeper, occasional farmer, raiser of racehorses and a businessman. Pindling's mother hailed from the island of Acklins, which she left as a child. Sir Lynden Pindling was their only child.

As a young boy, Pindling worked for his father's small grocery store which was attached to their home in East Street. He became chief delivery boy using the handlebars of his bike to make drop-offs in neighbouring areas. Earlier, this post had belonged to his then neighbour Sidney Poitier.

== Education ==
Pindling's parents wanted the best possible education available to him that they could afford, which led to Pindling transferring schools frequently in his earlier years.

He first attended Eastern Primary School, then located on School Lane between Shirley and Dowdeswell Street. He also spent some time at a Seventh-day Adventist primary school at his mother's behest.

Between the ages seven and nine, Pindling attended all three of the government's junior schools. He spent approximately one year each at Eastern Junior on Bay Street, Southern Junior on Wulff Road and Western Junior on the corner of Meeting Street and Hospital Lane.

He then spent three years at Western Senior School from 1940 to 1943, where the head teacher was musician (and composer of the Bahamian National anthem), Timothy Gibson from whom Pindling also later took piano lessons. Pindling also participated in sports like track and field and softball.

In the summer of 1943, Pindling along with hundreds of children from all over The Bahamas took examinations for enrolment in the selective Government High School (GHS). He was one of twenty who won a place. He graduated from GHS in 1946.

Pindling went on to study at King's College, University of London (1948–52), from which he received a law degree. He was admitted to the Middle Temple on 12 October 1948 and was Called to the Bar on 10 February 1953.

== Political career ==
=== Joining the PLP ===
By the end of 1953, Pindling had joined the newly-formed Progressive Liberal Party (PLP) as its legal advisor.

=== Parliamentary leader of the party ===
In May 1956, Pindling got married. The following month, he successfully contested Nassau's Southern District constituency in the 1956 general election.

He became Parliamentary Leader of the party when PLP Chairman and de facto leader, Henry Taylor, was defeated in the 1956 general election.

Pindling was elected the party's Parliamentary Leader over the dynamic and popular labour leader Randol Fawkes. He was appointed as the first leader of the opposition in 1964.

He would go on to win successive elections to the House of Assembly in 1962, 1967, 1968, 1972, 1977, 1982, 1987, 1992 and 1997.

=== Black Tuesday ===
On 27 April 1965, a day known in Bahamian history as "Black Tuesday", Pindling delivered a speech in the House of Assembly.

In a dramatic turn of events, Pindling ended his speech by taking the Speaker's Mace and, in a dramatic power-to-the-people gesture, throwing the mace out of a window onto the street, which temporarily halted proceedings.

=== Prime minister ===
Pindling was elected in 1967 on a platform that included hostility to gambling, corruption and the Bay Street Boys' mob connections.

On 10 January 1967, the PLP and the governing United Bahamian Party (led by Sir Roland Symonette) each won 18 seats in the Assembly. Randol Fawkes, the lone Labour MP, and Alvin Braynen, lent their votes to PLP allowing Pindling to form the first black government in Bahamian history.

Fawkes would be become Labour Minister and Braynen Speaker of the House of Assembly.

=== Independence ===
Pindling went on to lead the Bahamas to independence from Great Britain on 10 July 1973.

=== Achievements ===
He introduced social security measures in the form of the National Insurance Scheme, and the formation of the College of The Bahamas and the Royal Bahamas Defence Force.

Pindling held the additional portfolio of Minister of Finance from 1984 to 1990.

== Controversy ==
=== Early corruption claims ===
In 1966–67, the British government sent a Royal Commission of Inquiry to Nassau to investigate charges of widespread corruption in the Bahamian political system. The four-man commission was headed by Sir Ranulph Bacon, who had recently retired as deputy commander of Scotland Yard.

The commission reported that the United Bahamian Party, which had previously been in government, had been a front for mob-affiliated American casino interests, and that the former Premier, Sir Roland Symonette, and the influential Tourism Minister, Sir Stafford Sands, and some others, all received large payments from the casino and resort businesses they had permitted to operate.

The commission also found, however, that Pindling, during his campaign, had been funded and aided by U.S. casino operator Michael McLaney in the expectation that Pindling would permit McLaney to operate in the islands. Because of the report, Pindling broke his link with McLaney but was not himself prosecuted. Certain prominent mob figures, including Dino Cellini, were exiled from Bahamas but casino operations continued. Pindling told the commission that U.S. interests had first approached him with evidence to implicate the UBP in corruption, which led to the royal commission.

In 1973, during a U.S. Senate subcommittee investigation of corrupt offshore finances, mob elements accused Mike McLaney and his associate Elliott Roosevelt of having offered a contract to kill Pindling for reneging on the deal. This plot was discredited, but new elements of the control of the Miami Beach-based, Meyer Lansky-led syndicate over Bahamian business and politics emerged, as well as details of McLaney's dealings with Pindling, which included cash, aircraft, boats, and a campaign headquarters on Bay Street.

=== Later claims ===
In 1983, a report entitled The Bahamas: A Nation For Sale by investigative television journalist Brian Ross was aired on NBC in the United States. The report claimed Pindling and his government accepted bribes from Colombian drug smugglers, particularly the notorious Carlos Lehder, co-founder of the Medellín Cartel, in exchange for allowing the smugglers to use the Bahamas as a transshipment point to smuggle Colombian cocaine into the US.

Through murder and extortion, Lehder had gained complete control over the Norman's Cay in Exuma, which became the chief base for smuggling cocaine into the United States.

Lehder boasted to the Colombian media about his involvement in drug trafficking at Norman's Cay and about giving hundreds of thousands of dollars in payoffs to the ruling Progressive Liberal Party, but Pindling vigorously denied the accusations, and made a testy appearance on NBC to rebut them.

==== Commission of Inquiry ====
The public outcry, however, led to the creation in 1983 of the Royal Commission of Inquiry into Drug Trafficking and Government Corruption in the Bahamas.

A review of Pindling's personal finances by the Commission found that he had spent eight times his reported earnings from 1977 to 1984. According to the Inquiry, "[t]he prime minister and Lady Pindling have received at least $57.3 million in cash. Explanations for some of these deposits were given... but could not be verified."

In 2018, a New York Times wrote:

Sir Lynden spent much of his time working to improve the reputation of his country, but became vulnerable to charges of corruption in 1984, when an official commission set up to investigate drug trafficking in the Bahamas found wide evidence of official corruption in his cabinet and the Bahamian police. The commission eventually cleared Sir Lynden of any wrongdoing, but said that he and his wife had at least $3.5 million in bank deposits that could not be accounted for. At the 1987 trial of Lehder, prosecutors charged that he and other drug traffickers had paid at least $5 million to Pindling for permission to use the Bahamas as a shipment point for cocaine and marijuana bound for the United States.

Several commissioners were found guilty while Pindling was cleared, despite some lingering questions about how his expenses were eight times higher than reported. Pindling was able to win reelection in 1987 by focusing on nationalist and racial appeals as ways to combat the drug and corruption charges. The U.S. was still considering indicting Pindling in 1988.

=== Electoral defeat and retirement ===
However, in August 1992, the opposition Free National Movement (FNM) defeated the PLP in the general election due in part to scandals about the state-owned airline and the Bahamas Hotel Corporation run by the Pindlings.

After Pindling's defeat, new prime minister Hubert Ingraham "strongly rejected the idea that Sir Lynden or any member of his Government should be extradited to the United States to face possible charges."

The FNM would go on to win a second landslide victory in 1997, and Pindling retired from politics shortly afterward. He was succeeded as party leader by Perry Christie.

== Personal life ==
On 5 May 1956, Pindling married Marguerite McKenzie (later Lady Pindling and, in her own right, Dame Marguerite Pindling), of Long Bay Cays in Andros, at St Ann's Parish on Fox Hill Road in Nassau. They had four children. Pindling was a member of the Seventh-day Adventist Church.

== Honours, awards, and recognition ==
Pindling was sworn in as a member of Her Majesty's Most Honourable Privy Council (PC) in 1976, and he was appointed Knight Commander of the Order of St. Michael and St. George (KCMG) in 1982.

In 2018, he was posthumously awarded the Bahamian Order of National Hero (NH).

== Illness and death ==
In early 1996, Pindling began showing signs of tiredness and was diagnosed with early stage prostate cancer. He underwent a ten-week course of radiation treatment at Johns Hopkins Hospital's Oncology Center in Baltimore, and was given a clean bill of health, after which he returned to his post-Prime Minister work as lawyer.

In early July 2000, the cancer was found to have spread to his bones and Pindling was prescribed palliative care.

=== Death ===
Pindling died on Saturday, 26 August 2000 at his home on Skyline Drive, New Providence, surrounded by family. He was 70.

Following his death, 10 days of official mourning was declared nationwide. On 29 August, Parliament met, and then Prime Minister Hubert Ingraham and others paid public tribute. Two days later, all members of the Bahamas Bar did the same in a special session of the Supreme Court.

=== Lying in state and state funeral ===
Pindling's body was displayed in the House of Assembly on Rawson Square, for public viewing for four days, beginning early in the morning on Thursday, 31 August.

On 4 September, a full state funeral was held at the Church of God of Prophecy in New Providence, led by a long procession, with the Royal Bahamas Police Force Band at its front and the Royal Bahamas Defence Force Band at its rear.

His body was laid to rest at St Agnes Cemetery on Nassau Street in a mausoleum.

== Legacy ==
In 2006, Nassau International Airport was renamed Lynden Pindling International Airport in his honour. He is also depicted on the current one dollar Bahamian bank note. The documentary The Black Moses covered his life.

Political offices
Preceded by Roland Symonette	Premier of the Bahama Islands; 1967–69	Succeeded by Himself as Prime Minister of the Bahama Islands
Preceded by Himself as Premier of the Bahama Islands	Prime Minister of the Bahama Islands; 1969–73	Succeeded by Himself as Prime Minister of the Bahamas
Preceded by Himself as Prime Minister of the Bahama Islands	Prime Minister of the Bahamas; 1973–92	Succeeded by Hubert Ingraham
