= 1968 Bahamian general election =

- 10 April 1968

All 38 seats in the House of Assembly 20 seats needed for a majority
- Registered: 54,281
- Turnout: 85.50%
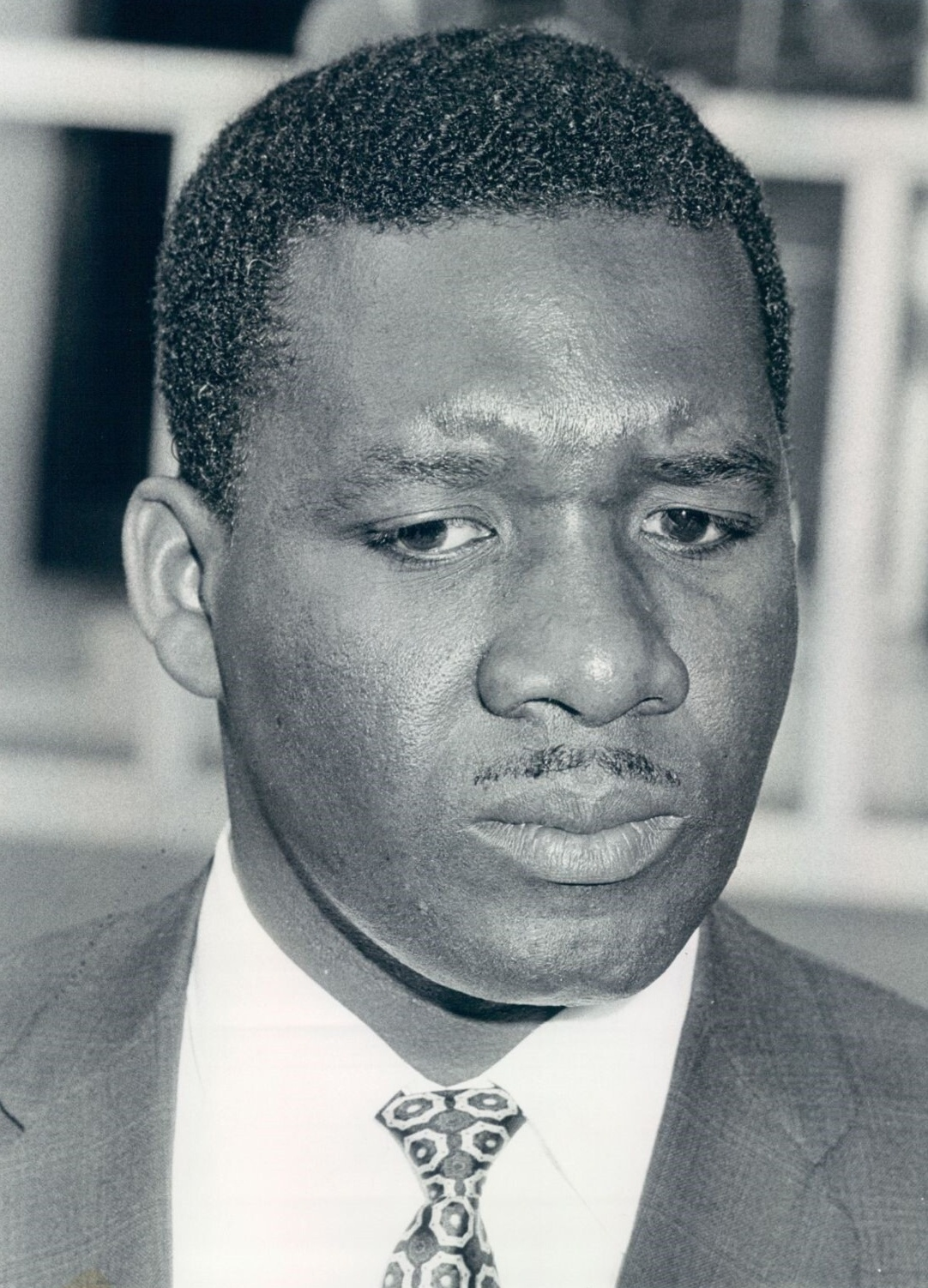

	First party	Second party
Leader	Lynden Pindling	Roland Symonette
Party	PLP	UBP
Leader's seat	Andros – Kemps Bay	New Providence East - Shirlea
Last election	42.83%, 18 seats	45.05%, 18 seats
Seats won	29	7
Seat change	▲11	▼11
Popular vote	29,156	12,371
Percentage	66.51%	28.22%
Swing	▲23.68pp	▼16.83pp
Premier before election
Lynden Pindling
PLP
Elected Premier
Lynden Pindling
PLP

Early general elections were held in the Bahamas on 10 April 1968. The result was a victory for the Progressive Liberal Party, which won 29 seats. Voter turnout was 85.5%.

== Results ==
Party	Votes	%	Seats	+/–
Progressive Liberal Party	29,156	66.51	29	+11
United Bahamian Party	12,371	28.22	7	–11
Labour Party	823	1.88	1	0
Independents	1,486	3.39	1	0
Total	43,836	100.00	38	0
Valid votes	43,836	94.45		
Invalid/blank votes	2,575	5.55		
Total votes	46,411	100.00		
Registered voters/turnout	54,281	85.50		
Source: Caribbean Elections

== Elected MPs ==
Number	Name	Party	District	Ethnicity
1	Cleophas Adderley	United Bahamian Party	New Providence – Nassau City	Black
2	R.F.A. Roberts	Progressive Liberal Party	New Providence East - Centreville	Black
3	Roland Symonette	United Bahamian Party	New Providence East - Shirlea	White
4	Arlington Butler	Progressive Liberal Party	New Providence East – Culmerville	Black
5	Arthur Hanna	Progressive Liberal Party	New Providence East – Anns Town	Black
6	S.L. Bowe	Progressive Liberal Party	New Providence East – Free Town	Black
7	Geoffrey Johnstone	United Bahamian Party	New Providence East – Fort Montagu	White
8	L.L. Davis	Progressive Liberal Party	New Providence East – Fox Hill	Black
9	E.L. Donaldson	Progressive Liberal Party	New Providence West - Killarney	Black
10	Clement T. Maynard	Progressive Liberal Party	New Providence West - Gambier	Black
11	C.C. McMillan	Progressive Liberal Party	New Providence West – Fort Charlotte	Black
12	Milo Butler	Progressive Liberal Party	New Providence West – Bains Town	Black
13	Cecil Wallace-Whitfield	Progressive Liberal Party	New Providence South – St. Agnes	Black
14	Arthur Foulkes	Progressive Liberal Party	New Providence South – Grants Town	Black
15	J.M. Thompson	Progressive Liberal Party	New Providence South – Fort Fincastle	Black
16	J.J. Shepherd	Progressive Liberal Party	New Providence South – St. Michaels	Black
17	Randol Fawkes	Labour Party	New Providence South – St. Barnabas	Black
18	Clifford Darling	Progressive Liberal Party	New Providence South - Englerston	Black
19	E.S. Moxey	Progressive Liberal Party	New Providence South – Coconut Grove	Black
20	Carlton Francis	Progressive Liberal Party	New Providence South – South Beach	Black
21	W.J. Levarity	Progressive Liberal Party	Grand Bahama – West End & Bimini	Black
22	M.E. Moore	Progressive Liberal Party	Grand Bahama	Black
23	Loftus Roker	Progressive Liberal Party	Andros – Nicholls Town & Berry Islands	Black
24	C.A. Bain	Progressive Liberal Party	Andros – Mangrove Cay	Black
25	Lynden Pindling	Progressive Liberal Party	Andros – Kemps Bay	Black
26	S.C. Bootle	Progressive Liberal Party	Abaco – Coopers Town	Black
27	Sherwin Archer	United Bahamian Party	Abaco – Marsh Harbour	White
28	Norman Solomon	United Bahamian Party	Harbour Island – St. George & Dunmore Town	White
29	Alvin Rudolph Braynen	Independent	Harbour Island – St. Johns	White
30	George Thompson	Progressive Liberal Party	Eleuthera – Governors Harbour	Black
31	Preston Albury	Progressive Liberal Party	Eleuthera – Rock Sound	Black
32	O.N. Johnson	Progressive Liberal Party	Cat Island	Black
33	George Smith	Progressive Liberal Party	Exuma – Rolleville	White
34	Livingston Coakley	Progressive Liberal Party	Exuma – George Town & Ragged Island	Black
35	Peter Graham	United Bahamian Party	Long Island – North Long Island, Rum Cay & San Salvador	White
36	Donald D'albenas	United Bahamian Party	Long Island – Clarence Town	White
37	W.A. Moss	Progressive Liberal Party	Crooked Islands, Long Cay, & Acklins	Black
38	J.R. Ford	Progressive Liberal Party	Mayaguana & Inagua Islands	Black
Source: Hughes
