= Elections in the Bahamas =

Elections in the Bahamas take place in the framework of a parliamentary democracy. Since independence, voter turnout has been generally high in national elections, with a low of 87.9% in 1987 and a high of 98.5% in 1997. The current Prime Minister is The Hon. Philip Davis.

== Electoral system ==
The electoral law of the Bahamas was passed on 31 December 1979. The main law governing parliamentary elections is the Parliamentary Elections Act 1992 (No. 1 of 1992), as amended. Elections are administered by the Parliamentary Registration Department, headed by a Parliamentary Commissioner appointed by the Governor-General. The Commissioner is responsible for maintaining the register of voters and conducting polls.

There is also an Electoral Broadcasting Council, which is responsible for ensuring that media reports are fair and not biased towards any party.

The country has a bicameral Parliament with a House of Assembly and Senate.

=== House of Assembly ===
The House of Assembly has 39 elected members who are elected in single-member constituencies. Elections for the House are held every 5 years.

Voters must be Bahamian citizens at least 18 years old and lived for three months in the constituency. They can be disqualified if insane, imprisoned or under a death sentence. Until 1972 British citizens could also vote if they had been resident for six months.

Candidates must be Bahamian citizens at least 21 years old, and have lived in the Bahamas for at least a year prior to the elections. Those with dual citizenship or an undischarged bankruptcy are ineligible, as are those who have a criminal conviction, a history of electoral fraud, or are insane or under a death sentence.

=== Senate ===
The Senate is unelected and consists of 16 members appointed by the Governor-General; nine on the advice of the Prime Minister, four on the advice of the leader of the opposition, and three on the advice of the Prime Minister after consultations with the leader of the opposition.

== Referendums ==
There have been two national referendums and one opinion poll held within the last twenty years. The first, held in 2002, it asked voters five questions ranging from changes to the constitution to the setting up of a national commission on teaching. The first opinion poll, held in January 2013, asked individuals whether they wanted to legalize online gambling. The second national referendum took place on June 7, 2016, and asked voters four questions pertaining to equal rights within the Bahamas. All three referendums/opinion polls were rejected.

== History ==
Prior to the introduction of universal suffrage in 1961, elections in the Bahamas were dominated by the white oligarchy known as the Bay Street Boys. They were represented by the United Bahamian Party (UBP), which by gerrymandering the constituency boundaries, won the 1962 elections despite receiving fewer votes than the black Progressive Liberal Party (PLP). In the next elections in 1967 the UBP received more votes than the PLP, but they won the same number of seats. With the support of the sole Labour Party MP the PLP was able to form the country's first black-led government.

The PLP dominated national politics until the 1990s, winning every election until 1992 when they were defeated by the Free National Movement (FNM) formed after a split within the PLP in 1971. The FNM won the next elections in 1997 in which voter turnout hit a record 98.5%, but power was ceded back to the PLP in 2002. The FNM returned to power again in 2007. The PLP regained power in 2012, only to lose it in 2017, when the FNM won 35 of 39 seats. The PLP then returned to office after the 2021 snap election, winning 32 seats and forming the government under Philip Davis.
