= 1967 Bahamian general election =

- 10 January 1967

All 38 seats in the House of Assembly 20 seats needed for a majority

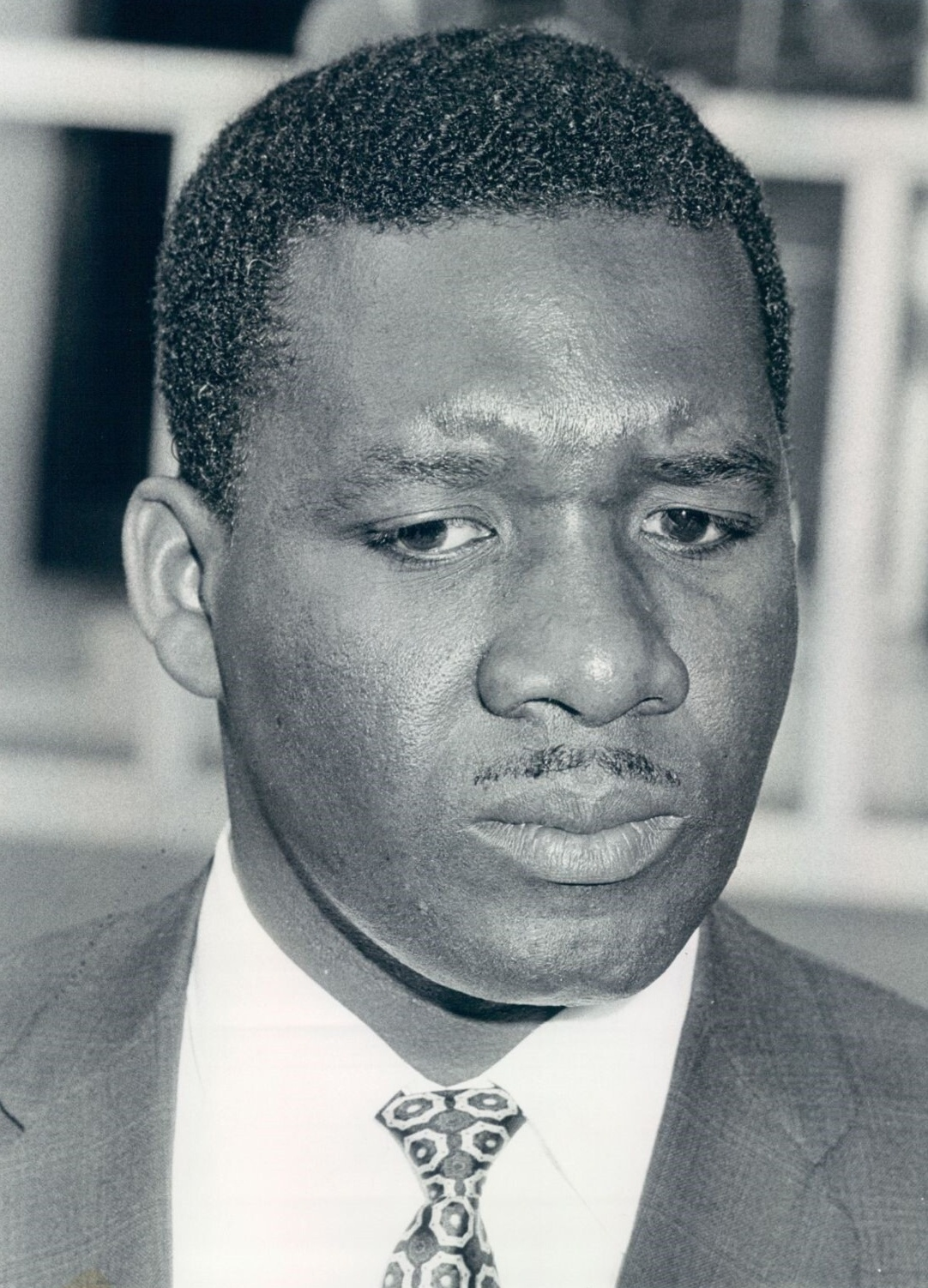
	First party	Second party
Leader	Roland Symonette	Lynden Pindling
Party	UBP	PLP
Leader's seat	New Providence East Central	New Providence South Central
Last election	36.14%, 18 seats	40.87%, 8 seats
Seats won	18	18
Seat change	Steady	▲10
Popular vote	19,408	18,452
Percentage	45.05%	42.83%
Swing	▲8.91pp	▲1.96pp
Premier before election
Roland Symonette
UBP
Elected Premier
Lynden Pindling
PLP

General elections were held in the Bahamas on 10 January 1967. The result was a tie between the Progressive Liberal Party and the United Bahamian Party, both of which won 18 seats. In a reversal of the previous election (in which the PLP received the most votes but the UBP won the most seats), this time the PLP received a lower share of the vote than the UBP, but was able to form the country's first black-led government with the support of the sole Labour Party MP Randol Fawkes.

== Results ==
Party	Votes	%	Seats	+/–
United Bahamian Party	19,408	45.05	18	0
Progressive Liberal Party	18,452	42.83	18	+10
Labour Party	2,118	4.92	1	0
National Democratic Party	2,118	4.92	0	New
Independents	3,107	7.21	1	–5
Total	43,085	100.00	38	+5
Source: Hughes, Bahamian Fragments

== Elected MPs ==
Number	Name	Party	District	Ethnicity
1	Stafford Sands	United Bahamian Party	New Providence – Nassau City	White
2	Roland Symonette	United Bahamian Party	New Providence East - Centreville	White
3	U. McPhee	Progressive Liberal Party	New Providence East - Shirlea	Black
4	G.D.F. Clarke	United Bahamian Party	New Providence East – Palmdale	White
5	Arthur Hanna	Progressive Liberal Party	New Providence East – Anns Town	Black
6	Geoffrey Johnstone	United Bahamian Party	New Providence East – Fort Montagu	White
7	Carlton Francis	Progressive Liberal Party	New Providence East – Winton	Black
8	E.L. Donaldson	Progressive Liberal Party	New Providence West - Killarney	Black
9	C.C. McMillan	Progressive Liberal Party	New Providence West – Fort Charlotte	Black
10	Milo Butler	Progressive Liberal Party	New Providence West – Bains Town	Black
11	Cecil Wallace-Whitfield	Progressive Liberal Party	New Providence South – St. Agnes	Black
12	Arthur Foulkes	Progressive Liberal Party	New Providence South – Grants Town	Black
13	J.M. Thompson	Progressive Liberal Party	New Providence South – Fort Fincastle	Black
14	J.J. Shepherd	Progressive Liberal Party	New Providence South – St. Michaels	Black
15	Randol Fawkes	Labour Party	New Providence South – St. Barnabas	Black
16	Clifford Darling	Progressive Liberal Party	New Providence South - Englerston	Black
17	E.S. Moxey	Progressive Liberal Party	New Providence South – Coconut Grove	Black
18	W.J. Levarity	Progressive Liberal Party	Grand Bahama – West End & Bimini	Black
19	M.E. Moore	Progressive Liberal Party	Grand Bahama	Black
20	William Christie	United Bahamian Party	Andros – Nicholls Town & Berry Islands	White
21	C.A. Bain	Progressive Liberal Party	Andros – Mangrove Cay	Black
22	Lynden Pindling	Progressive Liberal Party	Andros – Kemps Bay	Black
23	J.H. Bethell	United Bahamian Party	Abaco (first place)	White
24	Leonard Thompson	United Bahamian Party	Abaco (second place)	White
25	F.H. Christie	United Bahamian Party	Abaco (third place)	White
26	Norman Solomon	United Bahamian Party	Harbour Island (first place)	White
27	Alvin Rudolph Braynen	Independent	Harbour Island (second place)	White
28	George Thompson	Progressive Liberal Party	Eleuthera (first place)	Black
29	G. Baker	United Bahamian Party	Eleuthera (second place)	White
30	Preston Albury	Progressive Liberal Party	Eleuthera (third place)	Black
31	G.K. Kelly	United Bahamian Party	Cat Island	White
32	Robert Symonette	United Bahamian Party	Exuma (first place)	White
33	F.H. Brown	United Bahamian Party	Exuma (second place)	White
34	R.M. Solomon	United Bahamian Party	Rum Cay & San Salvador	White
35	Peter Graham	United Bahamian Party	Long Island (first place)	White
36	Donald D'albenas	United Bahamian Party	Long Island (second place)	White
37	B.T. Kelly	United Bahamian Party	Crooked Islands, Long Cay, & Acklins	White
38	Bernard Dupuch	United Bahamian Party	Mayaguana & Inagua Islands	White
Source: Hughes
