= 1956 Bahamian general election =

General elections were held in the Bahamas between 8 and 20 June 1956. Although the Progressive Liberal Party emerged as the largest party, winning six seats, the majority of seats were won by independents.

== Results ==
Party	Votes	%	Seats
Progressive Liberal Party	7,152	32.60	6
Bahama Democrat Labour Party	1,417	6.46	1
Independents	13,372	60.95	22
Total	21,941	100.00	29
Source: Hughes

=== Elected MPs ===
Number	Name	Party	District	Ethnicity
1	Stafford Sands	Independent	New Providence - Nassau City (first place)	White
2	Raymond W. Sawyer	Independent	New Providence - Nassau City (second place)	White
3	Roland Symonette	Independent	New Providence East (first place)	White
4	S.L. Isaacs	Progressive Liberal Party	New Providence East (second place)	Black
5	Milo Butler	Progressive Liberal Party	New Providence West (first place)	Black
6	Gerald Cash	Independent	New Providence West (second place)	Black
7	Randol Fawkes	Progressive Liberal Party	New Providence South (first place)	Black
8	Lynden Pindling	Progressive Liberal Party	New Providence South (second place)	Black
9	C.W.F. Bethell	Independent	Grand Bahama & Bimini	White
10	Cyril Stevenson	Progressive Liberal Party	Andros & Berry Islands (first place)	Black
11	Clarence Bain	Progressive Liberal Party	Andros & Berry Islands (second place)	Black
12	F.H. Christie	Independent	Abaco (first place)	White
13	Leonard Thompson	Independent	Abaco (second place)	White
14	H. Johnson (politician)	Independent	Abaco (third place)	White
15	J.T. Albury	Independent	Harbour Island (first place)	White
16	Alvin Braynen	Independent	Harbour Island (second place)	White
17	G.D. Foster Clarke	Independent	Harbour Island (third place)	White
18	Charles Trevor Kelly	Independent	Eleuthera (first place)	White
19	George Baker	Independent	Eleuthera (second place)	White
20	A.H. Pritchard	Independent	Eleuthera (third place)	White
21	Harold G. Christie	Independent	Cat Island(first place)	White
22	G.K. Kelly	Independent	Cat Island(second place)	White
23	F.H. Brown	Independent	Exuma (first place)	White
24	Robert Symonette	Independent	Exuma (second place)	White
25	Roy M. Solomon	Independent	Rum Cay & San Salvador	White
26	Donald D’albenas	Independent	Long Island (first place)	White
27	Peter Graham	Independent	Long Island (second place)	White
28	E.A.P. Dupuch	Bahama Democrat Labor Party	Crooked Islands, Long Cay, & Acklins	White
29	G.A. Bethell	Independent	Mayaguana & Inagua Islands	White
Source: Hughes
