= William Cartwright (Bahamian politician) =

Bahamian politician

William "Bill" Cartwright (c. 1923 – June 7, 2012) was a Bahamian politician, realtor and magazine publisher. Cartwright, together with Sir Henry Milton Taylor and Cyril Stevenson, co-founded the Progressive Liberal Party (PLP) in 1953, the first national political party to be established in the Bahamas. He was the last surviving member of the PLP's three founders.

== Career and influence ==
Cartwright was a native of Long Island, Bahamas. He was elected to the Bahamas House of Assembly, the lower house of Parliament, in 1949 as a representative of Cat Island. He served in parliament for seven years. Outside politics, Cartwright worked as a realtor before becoming a magazine publisher.

In 1953, William Cartwright, who owned The Bahamas Review purchased The Nassau Herald, on the death of it co-founder, Jack Stanley Lowe. Cyril Stevenson, who worked as a journalist at The Nassau Guardian became editor of the Herald. Later that year, Cartwright and Stevenson travelled to London to cover the coronation for The Bahamas Review. While there, they met with representatives of the Labour Party. They also travelled to Jamaica where they met with members of the Jamaican Labour Party and the People's National Party.

When they returned to Nassau, Cartwright and Stevenson joined with Henry Milton Taylor to found the Progressive Liberal Party (PLP), the first national political party in the Bahamas. Taylor became chair, Cartwright became the treasurer, and Stevenson became the secretary-general of the new party.

== Death and legacy ==
Cartwright resided at the Good Samaritan Home in Nassau for the final two years of his life. He died at Princess Margaret Hospital in Nassau at 4 a.m. on June 7, 2012, at the age of 89.

Bahamas Governor-General Arthur Foulkes had visited Cartwright three weeks before his death. Prime Minister of the Bahamas and leader of the PLP, Perry Christie, presented a speech in honor of Cartwright to the Assembly, calling him a "national hero" who contributed a "historical role he had played in laying the foundations for party politics in The Bahamas." Loretta Butler-Turner, the deputy leader of the opposition Free National Movement (FNM) and MP for Cartwright's native Long Island, said that "He is in his own right a founder of the modern Bahamas." Butler-Turner also called for the establishment of a national oral history project following Cartwright's death to preserve the modern, social and national history and national identity of the country.
