= Cyril Stevenson =

Bahamian politician and newspaper editor

Member of Parliament for Andros and the Berry Islands
- In office 1956–1967
- Succeeded by: Lynden Pindling

Personal details
- Born: June 13, 1914 Nassau, Bahamas
- Died: November 6, 2006 (aged 92) Nassau, Bahamas
- Party: PLP
- Spouse: June Maplethorpe
- Children: 5
- Occupation: Journalist, Politician

Cyril St. John Stevenson (July 13, 1914 – November 6, 2006) was a Bahamian politician and newspaper publisher. He was a journalist and the owner of the Nassau Herald. Together with Henry Milton Taylor and William Cartwright, Stevenson co-founded the Progressive Liberal Party (PLP) in 1953, the first political party in the Bahamas. He served as a member of parliament from 1956 to 1967. After his retirement from politics, he led the Bahamas Information Services from 1970 to 1985.

== Early life ==
Stevenson was born in Nassau, Bahamas, on July 13, 1914. He was the youngest child of Henry Macauley "Harry" Stevenson and Georgianna Louise "Lulie" Stevenson. His father died in 1915 when he was just fifteen months old. Stevenson attended Sacred Heart School but had to drop out aged 13 when his stepfather also died.

== Career ==
=== Early journalism career ===
Stevenson began a career in journalism as a reporter for the Bahamas Weekly News. In June 1952, Stevenson was working as a columnist at the Nassau Guardian. In December 1952, Stevenson was appointed as a member of the Hurricane Relief Committee.

In 1953, William Cartwright, owner of The Bahamas Review, purchased the now defunct newspaper, The Nassau Herald, and Stevenson became editor. Later that year, Stevenson and Cartwright travelled to London to cover the coronation. While there, they met with representatives of the Labour Party. They also travelled to Jamaica where they met with members of the Jamaican Labour Party and the People's National Party. Later that year, Stevenson and Cartwright, together with Henry Milton Taylor formed the Progressive Liberal Party (PLP). Stevenson became Secretary-General of the party; a post he served in until 1963.

In 1954, Stevenson became the owner of The Nassau Herald. At times, Stevenson used his editorial control of the Nassau Herald to promote the positions of the PLP party and to criticise the ruling government.

=== Political career ===
In 1956, Stevenson was elected to the House of Assembly, the lower house of parliament, from the Andros and the Berry Islands constituency. He joined the "Magnificent Six," a group of six MPs who formed the first opposition block in the Bahamas parliament. The group of six PLP parliamentary members consisted of Stevenson, Randol Fawkes, Lynden Pindling, Milo Butler, Sammy Isaacs, and Clarence A. Bain.

The 1958 General Strike led to constitutional reforms in the Bahamas. Previously in order to vote, a person could vote in any district in which they owned property valued of more than $14. In addition, there was a corporation vote allowing companies to vote. In the house's Constitution Committee, the United Bahamian Party argued for the retention of the plural vote, which would allow rich people to continue to vote in multiple constituencies. In his minority report, Stevenson made his position clear, that elections "to the General Assembly should be based on the [simple] principle of... one person, one vote."

In 1959, Stevenson agitated for the Harry Oakes' case to be reopened. Weeks before a vote in the House of Assembly, Stevenson’s house was shot at.

Stevenson was re-elected to the Assembly in the 1962 election, again representing portions of Andros Island and the Berry Islands. He lost his re-election in 1967, when he ran as an independent candidate and left the PLP. He retired from politics after his 1967 electoral defeat, but rejoined the PLP in 1970.

=== Later years ===
Stevenson became head of the Bahamas Information Services, a government department, in 1970. He gave control of his printing business to family members that same year to focus on his work with the Bahamas Information Services. He remained head of the Bahamas Information Services until his retirement in 1985.

== Awards and honours ==
Stevenson was made a Member of the Royal Victorian Order in 1975. In 1982, he was also made a Knight Commander and Knight Grand Cross of Malta.

He received an award for contributions to journalism by the Bahamas Press Club in 1999. In 2000, Jones Communication Limited also named Stevenson one of the 100 Most Outstanding Bahamians of the 20th century.

== Death and legacy ==
Cyril Stevenson died on November 6, 2006 at the age of 92. He was survived by his wife of 47 years, June Ellen Stevenson (née Maplethorpe), and five children. A state funeral was held at Christ Church Cathedral in Nassau on November 16, 2006.
