= 1962 Bahamian general election =

- 26 November 1962

All 33 seats in the House of Assembly 17 seats needed for a majority

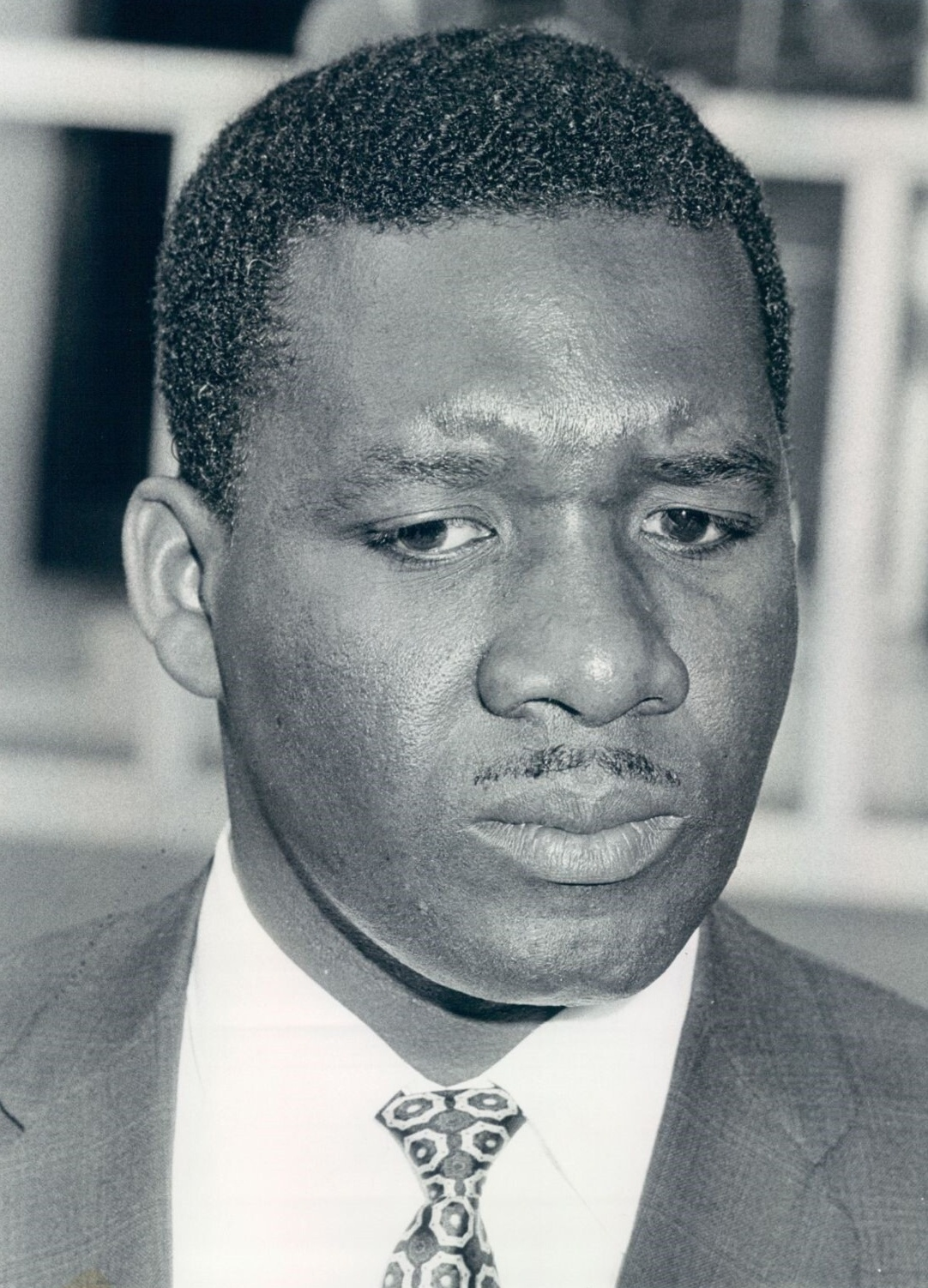
	First party	Second party
Leader	Roland Symonette	Lynden Pindling
Party	UBP	PLP
Leader's seat	New Providence East Central	New Providence South Central
Last election	Party established	32.60%, 6 seats
Seats won	18	8
Seat change	New	▲2
Popular vote	26,500	32,261
Percentage	36.14%	40.87%
Swing	New	▲8.27pp
Premier before election
Position established
Elected Premier
Roland Symonette
UBP

General elections were held in the Bahamas on 26 November 1962, the first under universal suffrage. Whilst the Progressive Liberal Party won the most votes, the United Bahamian Party won the most seats, largely as a result of gerrymandering.

== Results ==
Party	Votes	%	Seats	+/–
Progressive Liberal Party	32,261	44.00	8	+2
United Bahamian Party	26,500	36.14	18	New
Labour Party	3,049	4.16	1	New
Independents	11,516	15.71	6	–16
Total	73,326	100.00	33	+4
Source: Hughes

== Elected MPs ==
Number	Name	Party	District	Ethnicity
1	Stafford Sands	United Bahamian Party	New Providence - Nassau City (first place)	White
2	Raymond W. Sawyer	United Bahamian Party	New Providence - Nassau City (second place)	White
3	Roland Symonette	United Bahamian Party	New Providence East Central (first place)	White
4	Eugene Dupuch	Independent	New Providence East Central (second place)	White
5	Arthur Hanna	Progressive Liberal Party	New Providence East (first place)	Black
6	Geoffrey Johnstone	United Bahamian Party	New Providence East (second place)	White
7	Paul Adderley	Progressive Liberal Party	New Providence West (first place)	Black
8	Milo Butler	Progressive Liberal Party	New Providence West (second place)	Black
9	Lynden Pindling	Progressive Liberal Party	New Providence South Central (first place)	Black
10	Orville Turnquest	Progressive Liberal Party	New Providence South Central (second place)	Black
11	S.S. Bethel	Progressive Liberal Party	New Providence South (first place)	Black
12	Randol Fawlkes	Labour Party	New Providence South (second place)	Black
13	Harold Degregory	Independent	Grand Bahama & Bimini	White
14	Clarence Bain	Progressive Liberal Party	Andros & Berry Islands (first place)	Black
15	Cyril Stevenson	Progressive Liberal Party	Andros & Berry Islands (second place)	Black
16	Leonard Thompson	Independent	Abaco (first place)	White
17	F.H. Christie	United Bahamian Party	Abaco (second place)	White
18	J.H. Bethell	United Bahamian Party	Abaco (third place)	White
19	J.T. Albury	United Bahamian Party	Harbour Island (first place)	White
19	G.D. Foster Clarke	United Bahamian Party	Harbour Island (second place)	White
20	Alvin Braynen	Independent	Harbour Island (third place)	White
21	George Baker	United Bahamian Party	Eleuthera (first place)	White
22	Charles Trevor Kelly	United Bahamian Party	Eleuthera (second place)	White
23	Useph Baker	United Bahamian Party	Eleuthera (third place)	White
24	G.K. Kelly	United Bahamian Party	Cat Island	White
25	Harold G. Christie	United Bahamian Party	Cat Island	White
26	Robert Symonette	United Bahamian Party	Exuma (first place)	White
27	F.H. Brown	United Bahamian Party	Exuma (second place)	White
28	Roy M. Solomon	United Bahamian Party	Rum Cay & San Salvador	White
29	Peter Graham	United Bahamian Party	Long Island (first place)	White
30	Donald D’albenas	United Bahamian Party	Long Island (second place)	White
31	B.T. Kelly	United Bahamian Party	Crooked Islands, Long Cay, & Acklins	White
32	Bernard Dupuch	Independent	Mayaguana & Inagua Islands	White
Source: Hughes
