= Ruby Ann Darling =

Bahamian politician (born 1941)

Ruby Ann Cooper-Darling (born 28 June 1941) is a Bahamian politician and stateswoman.

In the 1962 Bahamian general election, Darling made history becoming the first woman to cast a vote in the country.

In 1974, she ran as an independent candidate in a by-election in the St Barnabas constituency. In 1982, she was appointed a Senator and served in that capacity for five years.

In the 1987 Bahamian general election, she became only the second woman to be elected to the House of Assembly. She was elected in the George Town/Ragged Island constituency for the Progressive Liberal Party.

In 2022, she was honoured as Ambassador for Women Affairs in the Commonwealth of The Bahamas.

On November 7, 2023, Darling was sworn in as the Deputy to the Governor-General of the Bahamas.
