= St. Barnabas (Bahamas Parliament constituency) =

Bahamas parliamentary constituency

- Constituency
- St. Barnabas is number 18
- District: New Providence

Current constituency
- Created: 2017 (current) 1967 (historic)
- Seats: 1
- Party: Progressive Liberal Party
- Member: Michael Halkitis

St. Barnabas is a parliamentary constituency represented in the House of Assembly of the Bahamas recreated in 2017. It elects one Member of Parliament (MP) using the First past the post electoral system. It has been represented by Michael Halkitis from the PLP since 2026. It was previously held by Shanendon Cartwright from the FNM since 2017.

The Nassau based constituency was known as New Providence South – St. Barnabas in the 20th century. The seat was named St. Cecilia until 2012 when it was abolished.

== History ==
When St. Barnabas was recreated for the 2017 election, it took in parts of Fort Charlotte, Bains Town and Grants Town, Centreville and Englerston.

== Members of Parliament ==
Election	Parliament	Candidate	Party
1967		Randol Fawkes	Labour Party
1968		Randol Fawkes	Labour Party
1972		S.S. Outten	Progressive Liberal Party
St. Cecilia
1997	9th Bahamian Parliament	Cynthia A. Pratt	Progressive Liberal Party
2002	10th Bahamian Parliament	Cynthia A. Pratt	Progressive Liberal Party
2007	11th Bahamian Parliament	Cynthia A. Pratt	Progressive Liberal Party
St. Barnabas
2017	13th Bahamian Parliament	Shanendon Cartwright	Free National Movement
2021	14th Bahamian Parliament	Shanendon Cartwright	Free National Movement
2026	15th Bahamian Parliament	Michael Halkitis	Progressive Liberal Party

== Elections ==
=== 1974 by-election ===
Ruby Ann Darling ran as an independent candidate.

=== 1987 by-election ===
This by-election was the final election contested by the Vanguard Nationalist and Socialist Party.

=== 2021 ===
7 candidates contested the 2021 Bahamian general election including:

- Alexander Barry Kemp (Kingdom Government Movement)
- Michael Peter Butler (Bahamian Way Forward Movement)
- Karen Butler (Independent)
- Shanendon Cartwright (FNM)
- Teddy Russell (Democratic National Alliance)

Shanendon Cartwright from the FNM was re-elected with a reduced majority.

=== 2026 ===
2026 Bahamian general election

== See also ==
- Constituencies of the Bahamas
