= Yamacraw (Bahamas Parliament constituency) =

Bahamas parliamentary constituency

- Constituency
- Yamacraw is 9 on this map of the 2021 election
- District: New Providence
- Electorate: 4,089 (2011); 5,268 (2021)

Current constituency
- Seats: 1
- Party: Progressive Liberal Party
- Member: Zane Lightbourne

Yamacraw is a parliamentary constituency represented in the House of Assembly of the Bahamas. It elects one member of parliament (MP) using the first past the post electoral system. It has been represented by Zane Lightbourne from the Progressive Liberal Party since 2021.

== Geography ==
The constituency comprises an area in the east of the city of Nassau, the capital and largest city of the Bahamas.

== Members of Parliament ==
Election	Parliament	Candidate	Party	Ref
1982	6th Bahamian Parliament	Janet Bostwick	Free National Movement	
1987	7th Bahamian Parliament	Janet Bostwick	Free National Movement	
1992	8th Bahamian Parliament	Janet Bostwick	Free National Movement	
1997	9th Bahamian Parliament	Janet Bostwick	Free National Movement	
2002	10th Bahamian Parliament	Melanie Griffin	Progressive Liberal Party	
2007	11th Bahamian Parliament	Melanie Griffin	Progressive Liberal Party	
2012	12th Bahamian Parliament	Melanie Griffin	Progressive Liberal Party	
2017	13th Bahamian Parliament	Elsworth Johnson	Free National Movement	
2021	14th Bahamian Parliament	Zane Lightbourne	Progressive Liberal Party	
2026	15th Bahamian Parliament	Zane Lightbourne	Progressive Liberal Party	

== Election results ==
2021
Party	Candidate	Votes	%	±%
PLP	Zane Lightbourne	1,832	50.37	▲12.37
FNM	Elsworth Johnson	1,490	40.97	▼17.03
COI	Chad Rutherford	214	5.88	
United Coalition Movement	Charlene Paul	88	2.42	▼1.50
Grand Commonwealth Party	Lisa Williams	12	0.33	
Faith that Moves Mountains Party	Arnold Simmons	1	0.03	
Turnout		3,637	69.04	
PLP gain from FNM				

== See also ==
- Constituencies of the Bahamas
