= Janet Bostwick =

Bahamian lawyer and politician

Dame Janet Gwennett Bostwick DBE (née Musgrove; born 30 October 1939) is a Bahamian lawyer and politician. She entered politics in 1977 with an appointment to the Senate. She was the first woman to serve as acting Prime Minister, first woman Attorney-General and the first woman Member of Parliament in the Bahamas.

== Biography ==
Janet Gwennett Musgrove was born in Nassau to Nick and Lois Musgrove. In 1957, she began working as a stenographer in the Legal Department of the Bahamas and by 1961 had become the private secretary of the Attorney General.

Between 1967 and 1971, she served as an Administrative Officer of the Legal Department and attended law school, earning her membership to the Bahamas Bar Association in 1971. Through 1974, she served as Crown Counsel simultaneously serving as Crown Prosecutor, leaving the government service in 1975 for private law practice. Between 1980 and 1981, she became the first woman to serve as president of the bar association.

In 1977, Bostwick was appointed as a Senator and in the 1982 Bahamian general election, she ran as a candidate of the Free National Movement (FNM) winning her race and becoming the first woman to serve in the House of Assembly. For the next twenty years, she served as MP for Yamacraw, sponsoring such legislation as the Matrimonial Causes Act (1978); the Affiliation Proceedings Act (1981); the Bar Act (1981); the Female Employees (Grant of Maternity Leave) Act (1988); and the Sexual Offenses and Domestic Violence Act (1991). She was appointed as Minister of Housing and Labour from 1992 to 1994 and served from 1994 to 1995 as Minister of Justice and Immigration. Between 1995 and 2001, she served as Attorney-General and simultaneously as Minister of Foreign Affairs (1995) and Minister for Women's Affairs (1995-2001).

Her appointment as Attorney General marked the first time a woman had served in that capacity. In 1998, when the Prime Minister and his deputy were both absent from the country, Bostwick became the first woman to act as Prime Minister. In 2002, Bostwick lost her re-election bid to Melanie Griffin. In 2011, Bostwick became the Deputy to the Governor General.

== Affiliations ==
Bostwick served as president of the Free National Movement Women's Association, president of the International Caribbean Women for Democracy and on the Executive Committee of the Girl's Brigade. In 2012, she was honored as Nassau's nominee of the International Woman of Courage Award.

The Janet Bostwick Medal for Women in the Foreign Service is named after her. Recipients include Patricia Rodgers (2014).

== Personal life ==
She is married to John Henry Bostwick, who from 1992 to 2002 served as President of the Senate. The couple has four children.

== Sources ==
- Sleeman, Elizabeth (2001). The International Who's Who of Women 2002. London: Europa Publications. ISBN 978-1-85743-122-3.
