= Philip Galanis =

Member of the House of Assembly
- In office 1997–2002
- Constituency: Englerston

Personal details
- Born: Philip Christopher Galanis; 1953 or 1954
- Died: 11 October 2024 (aged 70)
- Party: Progressive Liberal Party
- Education: St. John's University

Philip Christopher Galanis (c. 1954 – 11 October 2024) was a Bahamian businessman, accountant, columnist and politician who served one term in the Bahamian House of Assembly and two terms in the Senate.

== Early life ==
Galanis graduated from St. John's University in Minnesota in 1975.

== Career ==
Galanis founded accounting firm HLB Galanis & Co in 1998 and served as the managing partner of Ernst & Young in the Bahamas. He served as the President of the Bahamas Institute of Chartered Accountants and the Institute of Chartered Accountants of the Caribbean. He served as chairman of the Bahamas Trade Commission and as the Bahamas' chief negotiator during the country's accession to the World Trade Organization.

He wrote for the column "Consider This", which was regularly published in The Nassau Guardian for 13 years.

Galanis was elected to the House of Assembly after the 1997 Bahamian general election as a member of the Progressive Liberal Party (PLP).

Galanis was a member of the St. John's University board of trustees from 2016 to 2023, and served on the university's Leadership Council from 2019 until his death.

== Death ==
Galanis died at his home on 11 October 2024 at the age of 70. A state-recognised funeral was held on 1 November 2024.

Prime Minister Philip Davis described Galanis as "a progressive warrior and a nation builder".

The Bahamian Ministry of Education and Technical and Vocational Training and the College of Saint Benedict and Saint John's University in Minnesota established a memorial scholarship in his honour. The SJU Alumni Association posthumously awarded him their highest honour, the Fr. Walter Reger Award, in 2025, citing him as a "generous donor and enthusiastic supporter" of both schools.
