= 1958 General Strike =

Strike in Nassau, Bahamas

The 1958 General Strike was a three-week strike in Nassau, The Bahamas, that led to notable political and social change in the country. It has been described as "one of the most seminal events of the modern Bahamas".

In November of 1957, the new Nassau International Airport opened on the site of the former Windsor Field air base. Hotels entered into discussions with two companies to shuttle passengers to and from the airport, a deal that would likely lead to taxi drivers being excluded from the airport trade. In an act of civil disobedience, taxi drivers used their cabs to blockade the airport on November 2 and 3, 1957. The blockade forced the closure of the airport and led to flights being grounded or to turn back. The blockade was called off after 30 hours after all parties agreed to talk. However, negotiations broke down in early January 1958. The taxi union reached out to other unions and a general strike was called in solidarity.

On January 12, 1958, up to 2000 workers across the capital went on strike simultaneously. As reported by The New York Times on January 19, 1958, the initial strike, which was a dispute between local taxi drivers and rival transportation interests, quickly spread. This led to hotel employees, garbage removers, and electric power workers joining the walk-out. At the time, Nassau could accommodate 4,000 tourists a day. This strike catalyzed by taxi drivers and championed by Bahamians across the hotel and service sectors temporarily crippled the country's travel economy.

The strike brought the city to a near standstill for three weeks. It ended when an agreement was reached regarding transportation of passengers at the airport. However, it was the constitutional and labour reforms that resulted from the collective show of force that would have a long-lasting effect on the country.

A bevy of new laws between 1958 and 1960 resulted in a new department of labour and new labour laws, the abolition of the company vote, and the extension of the right to vote to all men over 21, as opposed to only men who owned or leased high valued property. In 1961, the law changed further to allow women to vote for the first time in the 1963 general election. In 1962, the parliamentary term was reduced from seven to five years. 10 years after the strike, the first black government was elected to run the country, ushering in what is commonly referred to in the Bahamas as 'majority rule'.

== Background ==
With the advent of air travel, the Bahamas became a tourist hotspot, attracting approximately 200,000 tourists annually, a six-fold increase between 1949 and 1958. The minority-led government set up the Development Board to promote tourism, while an Airport Board was responsible for determining parking concessions at airports.

In November 1957, the new Nassau International Airport opened on the site of the former Windsor Field military air base.

The hotels entered into discussions to franchise two companies, one owned by Dan Knowles and the other, the Meter Taxi Cab firm, to shuttle passengers to and from the airport. While hotels already provided their own transport for some customers from the old Oakes Field airport, the new deals would likely expand the number of passengers carried while pushing taxi drivers out of the airport trade. Moreover, one of two companies, the Meter Taxi Cab firm, had ties with the Bay Street merchants, who dominated the minority white-led government.

== Initial blockade ==
The 200-strong Bahamas Taxi Cab Union, led by Clifford Darling, used their cabs to blockade the airport on 2 and 3 November 1957. The blockade forced the closure of the airport and the cancellation of flights. A Pan-Am flight from New York landed at 2:30pm on the 2nd of November, but air traffic control was suspended and all other planes were turned away and forced to either return or divert to Miami.

A cooling-off period of eight weeks was agreed to, in which the hotels would not transport guests from the new airport while a permanent solution was negotiated.

== Negotiations ==
Discussions were held with all parties: the government, the hotel association, the Taxi Cab Union, and the tour companies. After a six-week cooling off period, an agreement had not been reached. Negotiations stalled over one point; the tour companies rejected a cab-rank system, wanting to handpick taxi drivers. The tour companies also started to raise issues that had been previously settled.

Darling approached the Bahamas Federation of Labour and its president, Randol Fawkes, for assistance. Although separate, the Taxi Cab Union were paying members of the Federation.

In the backdrop to negotiations, Governor Raynor Arthur announced annual appointments to the government corporation boards at the beginning of January. Despite the Bahamas having an 85% black population, the majority of board appointees were white, and no black person was named to the Development Board.

At a meeting on 12 January 1958, a motion was unanimously carried that the Federation "should call a general strike to aid the taxi union and to dramatise the fight of all Bahamians for greater dignity and self-respect on the job-site through decent wages and better working conditions."

== Strike ==
Across the country, on the morning of Monday, 13 January 1958, starting with the Emerald Beach Hotel, about 2000 workers across the city walked off the job.

With few remaining employees to service them, the city's 16 hotels had to close, and 3,500 tourists left the island. It was estimated that the colony lost an estimated $110,000 in tourist dollars daily. The public also boycotted Bay Street business, controlled by many of the merchants who made up the government, and downtown Nassau became a ghost town. The New York Times reported, "What began last Saturday as a fairly simple dispute between the taxi union and the tourist agencies had evolved into a mass protest against the 'Bay Street merchants'."

On 14 January, a large crowd protested the opening of Parliament. On 15 January, the Royal Worcestershire Regiment flew in from Jamaica after Governor Arthur requested a company of British troops be sent to the capital. The men, who had been stationed in British Honduras, arrived via Jamaica. An anti-submarine frigate also arrived "with technicians to maintain essential services".

The strikers received moral support from overseas labour groups, including the American AFL-CIO and Jamaica's Chief Minister Norman Manley. Representatives from the British Trades Union Congress met with the Governor. Representatives from the International Confederation of Free Trade Unions and the National Worker's Union in Jamaica also visited. Jamaica's House of Representatives passed a referendum calling for a Commission of Inquiry.

The strike lasted for three weeks.

== Resolution ==
On 29 January 1958, the Governor held a conference involving the representatives of the tour companies and the taxi union. The result was "a detailed agreement providing for the more equitable division of transportation of passengers to and from the airport" and the governor agreed to set up a transport authority to resolve the dispute. The strike was called off on 30 January 1958 after 18 days. The long-term result of the strike was constitutional and labour reforms.

When asked about the strike in the British House of Commons in February 1958, Alan Lennox-Boyd, the Secretary of State for the Colonies, responded:

The dispute between the taxi-cab union and the tour company operators, which led to the general strike, has been settled by a detailed legal agreement, a copy of which I am placing in the Library of the House. It is not possible to summarise its contents shortly, but it provides in detail for the way in which passengers from the airport should be transported in cars belonging to the two parties to the dispute. There were no specific terms on which the general strike ended, but, broadly speaking, there was a return to work on the same terms as those applying before the strike, wherever jobs were available. With regard to the last part of the Question, the Governor informs me that it is now hoped that there will be support in the House of Assembly for the enactment of legislation for three purposes: first, to govern the remuneration and conditions of service of hotel workers and to provide machinery for dealing with grievances; second, to set up effective machinery for collective bargaining and to enable hotel and agricultural workers to form their own trade unions; and thirdly, to establish a Labour Department on the lines proposed in the Grossmith-Ogilvie Report—made by two members of my Department.

== Aftermath ==
Three months after the strike, in April 1958, Lennox-Boyd visited Nassau. He met with the ruling United Bahamian Party (UBP) and the opposition Progressive Liberal Party (PLP) and visited some of the family islands. Lennox-Boyd pressed the need for constitutional reforms by the colonial government.

The Trade Union and Industrial Conciliation Act was passed in July 1958, setting up a Labour Department and providing rules for industrial action. Legislation was also introduced to provide for a Road Traffic Authority and allowing hotel and agricultural workers to unionise.

In 1960, there were additional constitutional reforms. Previously, in order to vote, a person had to own property valued at over $14 or be a tenant paying more than $6.50 rent per year. However, only one tenant per building could vote. In addition, there was a corporation vote, allowing companies to vote in each electorate in which they owned more than $14 of property. In 1959, the General Assembly Election Act was passed, resulting in the company vote being abolished and voting opening up to all men over the age of 21. In addition, the plural vote (which allowed people to vote in multiple constituencies) was limited to two, and four new parliamentary seats were established. Notably, all four seats were later won by the PLP.

In the decade following the general strike, political life in the Bahamas changed significantly. In 1961, the law changed to allow women to vote for the first time beginning in 1963. In 1962, the parliamentary term was reduced from 7 years to 5 years. In 1967, the first black government was elected to run the country in what is commonly referred to in the Bahamas as 'majority rule'.
