= St. Anne's (Bahamas Parliament constituency) =

Bahamas parliamentary constituency

- Constituency
- St. Anne's is 10 on this map of the 2021 election
- District: New Providence
- Electorate: 3,987 (2011); 5,475 (2021)

Current constituency
- Seats: 1
- Party: Free National Movement
- Member: Adrian White

St. Anne's is a parliamentary constituency represented in the House of Assembly of the Bahamas. It elects one member of parliament (MP) using the first past the post electoral system. It has been represented by Adrian White from the Free National Movement since 2021.

== Geography ==
The constituency comprises an area on the east coast of New Providence, in the city of Nassau, the capital and largest city of the Bahamas.

== Members of Parliament ==
| Election | Parliament | Candidate | Party |
|---|---|---|---|
| 2007 | 11th Bahamian Parliament | Brent Symonette | Free National Movement |
| 2012 | 12th Bahamian Parliament | Hubert Chipman | Free National Movement |
| 2017 | 13th Bahamian Parliament | Brent Symonette | Free National Movement |
| 2021 | 14th Bahamian Parliament | Adrian White | Free National Movement |

== Election results ==
2021
| Party | Candidate | Votes | % | ±% |
|---|---|---|---|---|
| FNM | Adrian White | 2,007 | 57.11 | ▼18.89 |
| PLP | Christopher Saudners | 1,253 | 35.66 | ▲16.66 |
| COI | Shaniese Miller | 172 | 4.89 | |
| DNA | Luisa Jorrin | 65 | 1.85 | ▼3.15 |
| Faith that Moves Mountains Party | Otis Forbes | 17 | 0.48 | ▼0.52 |
| Turnout | | 3,514 | 64.18 | |
| FNM hold | | | | |

== See also ==
- Constituencies of the Bahamas
