= Elsworth Johnson =

Bahamian politician

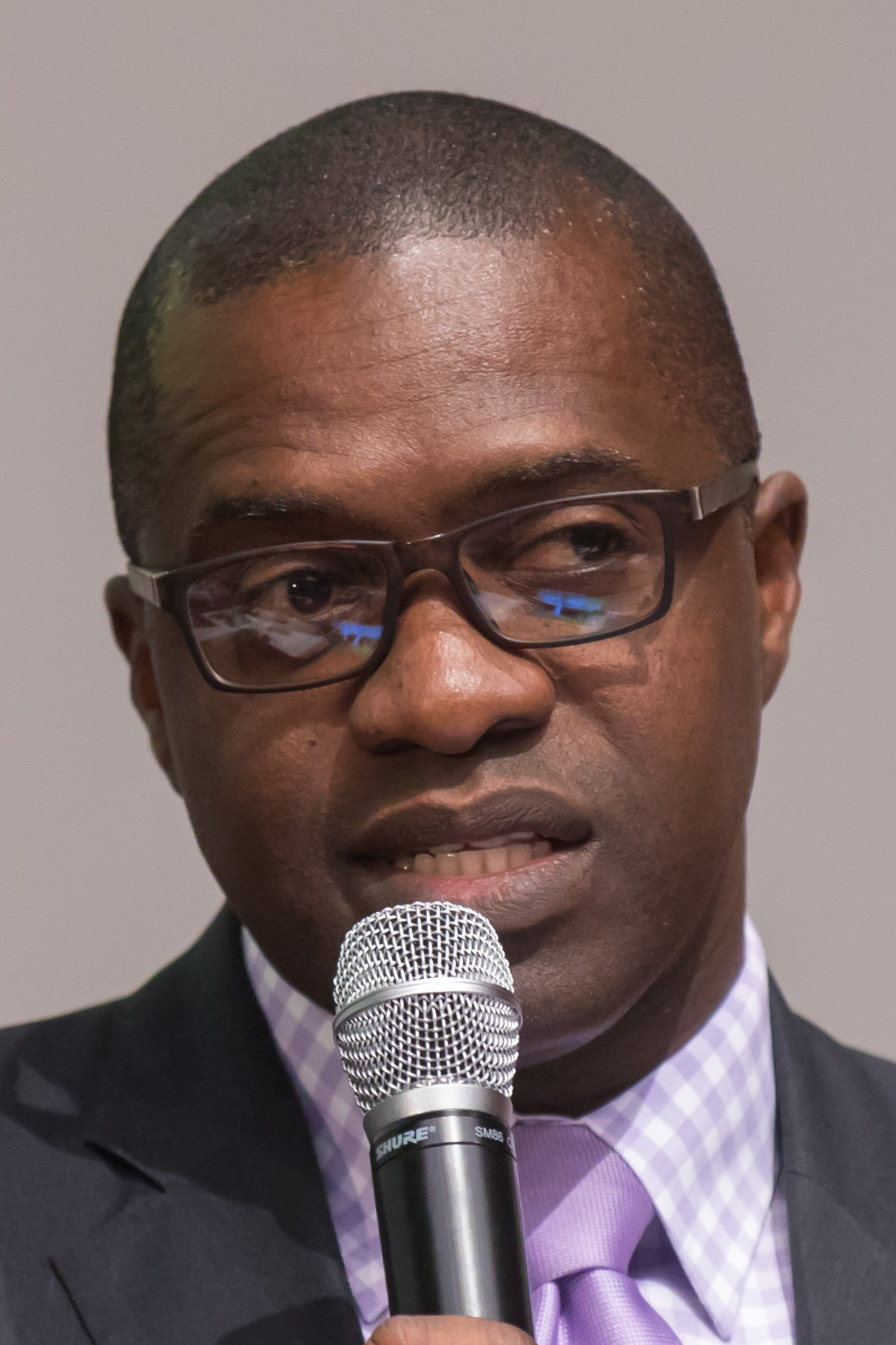
- Johnson in 2018

Member of the Parliament of the Bahamas for Yamacraw
- In office 10 May 2017 – 16 September 2021
- Preceded by: Melanie Griffin
- Succeeded by: Zane Lightbourne

Personal details
- Born: Cat Island, Bahamas
- Party: Free National Movement

Elsworth N. Johnson is a Bahamian politician from the Free National Movement (FNM) who served as the Member of Parliament for the Yamacraw constituency from 2017 to 2021.

== Biography ==
In the 2017 Bahamian general election, Johnson was elected MP for Yamacraw. Johnson served as Minister of Immigration under Hubert Minnis. Johnson was unseated in the 2021 Bahamian general election. Johnson is the FNM candidate for Yamacraw in the 2026 Bahamian general election.

== See also ==
- 13th Bahamian Parliament
