= Loftus Roker =

Bahamian politician (1935–2024)

The Honourable A. Loftus Roker

Personal details
- Born: 25 August 1935 Delectable Bay, Acklins, Bahamas
- Died: 13 May 2024 (aged 88) Nassau, Bahamas

Hon. A. Loftus Roker (25 August 1935 – 13 May 2024) was a Bahamian Progressive Liberal Party politician. He was considered a "founding father" of the modern nation. His hard-line approach to illegal immigration and drug trafficking made him a defining political figure in his era.

== Early life and education ==
Roker was born on 25 August 1935 to Elkin and Dolores Theodora Roker. He attended the local school in Pompey Bay and the Western Senior High School in New Providence. Roker graduated with a law degree at the University of London and was a member of the Middle Temple. He was called to the Bar in 1962.

== Political career ==
Roker ran in the 1968 Bahamian general election and was elected in the Nicholls Town and Berry Islands Constituency in the House of Assembly.

Roker served as the Chairman of the Gaming Board and as a member of the Advisory Council to the Ministry of Education between 1968 and 1971.

In 1971, Prime Minister, Sir Lynden Pindling appointed him to the post of Minister of Health and Housing. In December 1972, Roker was one of only fifteen in a national delegation that travelled to London to negotiate the terms of the country's independence.

In 1985, Roker was appointed Minister of National Security.

In 2023, Pompey Bay High School was renamed in his honour.

== Personal life and death ==
Roker was a devout Anglican. He considered himself to be a ‘black nationalist who believed in black leadership'.

Roker died in Nassau on 13 May 2024, at the age of 88.
