= Arlington Butler =

Bahamian teacher, lawyer, and politician

Speaker of the House of Assembly of the Bahamas
- In office 18 October 1972 – 20 October 1977
- Prime Minister: Lynden Pindling
- Preceded by: Alvin Rudolph Braynen
- Succeeded by: Clifford Darling

Personal details
- Born: 2 January 1938
- Died: 9 November 2017 (aged 79)
- Party: Progressive Liberal Party
- Spouse(s): Sheila Paulett Butler (1965-2013); Hazel Scott (2015-2017)
- Children: Arvin Griffith Butler, Arlington Gibao Butler, Kara Shelagh Paulette Butler-Wight, Kristal Unoma Maria Butler-Lafleur
- Education: Government High School

Sir Arlington Griffith Butler KCMG (2 January 1938 – 9 November 2017) was a Bahamian teacher, lawyer, politician, and civil servant.

He was the longest serving president of the Bahamas Olympic Committee and a key figure in its growth and development.

== Early life and education ==
He was born on 2 January 1938 in Nassau. Butler attended the Bahamas Teachers College, the University of Nottingham, and the Longborough Training College. He was an administrator at Government High School and Prince William High School. Butler became a lawyer in 1974.

== Political career ==
He first ran for a seat on the House of Assembly representing the Progressive Liberal Party in 1967, and lost. Butler contested the next year's elections, and won. He was reelected in 1972 and served as Speaker of the House of Assembly from that year until 1977, when he left the PLP. Butler launched an unsuccessful independent campaign in 1977, and later joined the Free National Movement. He ran under the FNM banner in 1982 and 1987, but never returned to parliament. Butler was Minister of Public Safety from 1992 to 1995 under the Hubert Ingraham government. He was named ambassador to the United States from 1996 to 1997. Outside of politics, Bulter was the longtime president of the Bahamas Olympic Committee.

== Private life ==
His first wife Shelia Paulette Butler (née Smith) passed away in 2013. In 2015, Sir Butler married Ms Hazel Scott.

Butler died at the Princess Margaret Hospital on 9 November 2017, aged 79.

He was survived by wife Hazel and children Arvin, Arlington Gibao, Krystal Lafleur, and Kara Butler-Wright. A legal battle over the inheritance broke out between his widow and children from the first marriage.
