= Zane Lightbourne =

Bahamian politician

Member of the Parliament of the Bahamas for Yamacraw
- Incumbent
- Assumed office 2021
- Preceded by: Elsworth Johnson

Personal details
- Party: Progressive Liberal Party

Zane Enrico Lightbourne is a Bahamian politician from the Progressive Liberal Party.

== Career ==
Lightbourne is a teacher by profession and has previously served as a union representative in The Bahamas Union of Teachers. In the 2021 Bahamian general election, he was elected in Yamacraw.

In 2021, he was appointed as the Minister of State in the Ministry of Education, Technical and Vocational Training. In a cabinet shuffle in 2024, his portfolio was changed to Minister of State in the Ministry of Environment and Natural Resources. In 2024, he led the Bahamas Delegation to the IAEA Nuclear Security Conference.

== See also ==
- 14th Bahamian Parliament
