= Adrian White (politician) =

Bahamian politician

Member of the Parliament of the Bahamas for St. Anne's
- Incumbent
- Assumed office 2021
- Preceded by: Brent Symonette

Personal details
- Party: Free National Movement
- Education: University of Buckingham (LLB)

Adrian R White is a Bahamian politician from the Free National Movement. He is member of the Parliament of the Bahamas for St. Anne's.

== Early life ==
White completed a Bachelor of Laws (LLB) at the University of Buckingham. In 2001, he was admitted as a barrister of Gray's Inn and a counsel and attorney of the Bahamas Supreme Court.

== See also ==
- 14th Bahamian Parliament
