= Brent Symonette =

Bahamian businessman and politician (born 1954)

The Honourable Brent Symonette
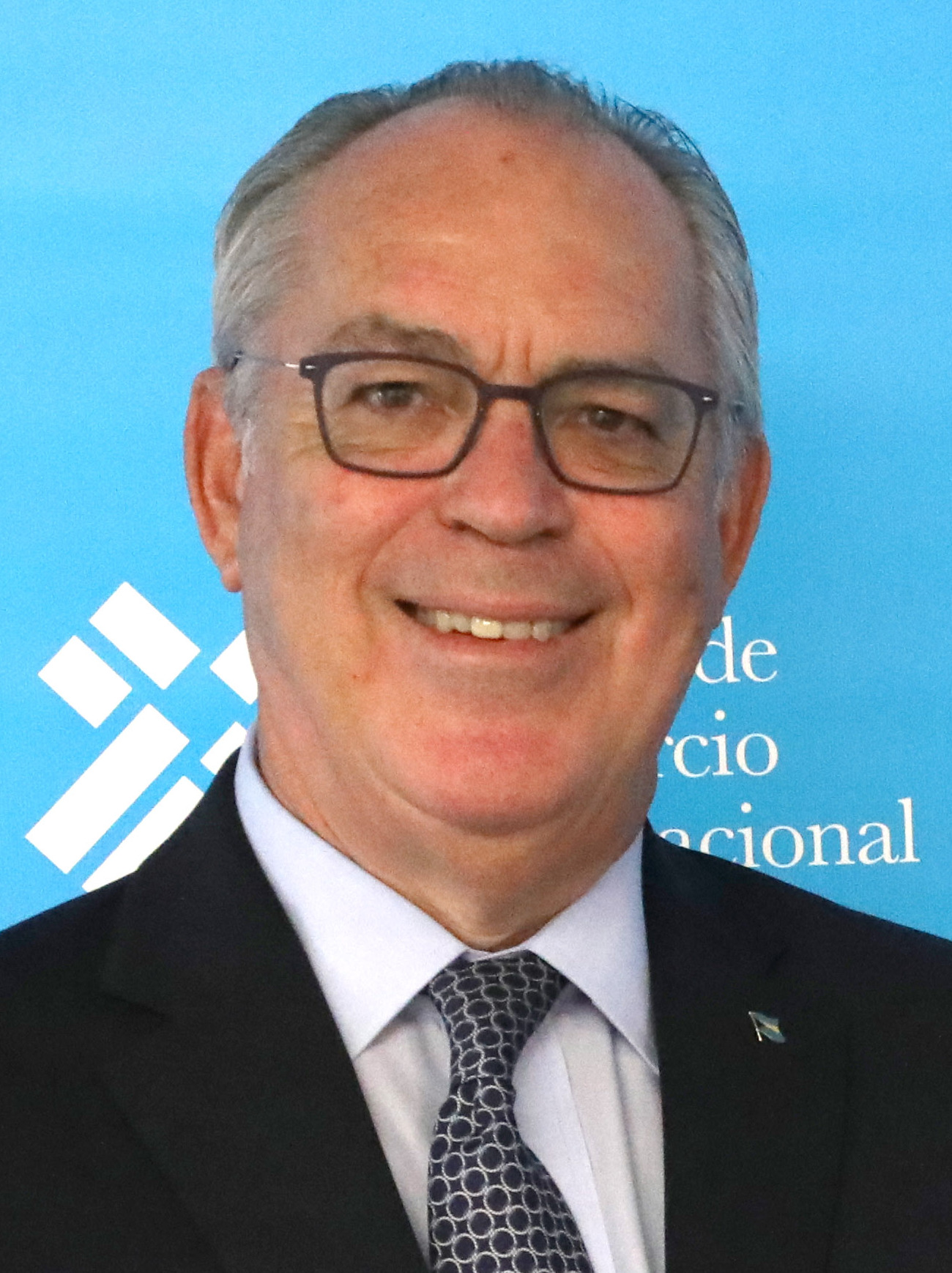
- Brent Symonette in 2018

Deputy Prime Minister of the Bahamas
- In office 2007–2012
- Prime Minister: Hubert Ingraham
- Preceded by: Cynthia A. Pratt
- Succeeded by: Philip Davis

Member of Parliament for Saint Anne's
- In office May 2017 – September 2021
- Succeeded by: Adrian White
- In office 2007–2012
- Preceded by: Constituency established
- Succeeded by: Hubert Chipman

Personal details
- Born: Theodore Brent Symonette; February 2, 1954 (age 72)
- Party: Free National Movement

Theodore Brent Symonette (born 2 December 1954) is a Bahamian businessman and Free National Movement politician who was the Member of Parliament (MP) for St. Anne's constituency from 2007 to 2012 and 2017 to 2021. In his first term, he served as Deputy Prime Minister to Hubert Ingraham and Minister of Foreign Affairs. In his second, he was the Minister of Financial Services, Trade and Industry and Immigration from 2017 to 2019.

== Early life ==
Symonette was born in Nassau, Bahamas. He is the youngest son of Sir Roland Symonette (1898–1980), the first Premier of the Bahamas and Lady Margaret Symonette née Frances. Symonette is also the half brother of Bobby Symonette, who served as Speaker of the House of Assembly. He studied law in London and is a member of the Bahamas Bar. Symonette is also an established real estate broker.

== Career ==
Symonette was appointed to the Senate in 1987 by Sir Cecil Wallace-Whitfield and reappointed to the Senate in 1992 by Prime Minister Hubert Ingraham. Symonette was one of a handful of white Members of Parliament.

Symonette served as Attorney-General in 1995, Minister of Tourism and Chairman of the Airport Authority. As Chairman of the Hotel Corporation of the Bahamas, Symonette was instrumental in negotiations that resulted in bringing the Atlantis Hotel and affiliated resort properties to the Bahamas.

Symonette was the first MP to hold the St Anne's constituency upon its creation in 2007. Following the FNM victory in the general election that year, Symonette was sworn in as Deputy Prime Minister and Minister of Foreign Affairs in Ingraham's government on May 4.

In January 2012, Symonette announced he would be resigning from politics and stood down at the 2012 general election. In 2016, his successor Hubert Chipman withdrew his name from consideration for the FNM nomination. Symonette changed his mind and, despite supporting Loretta Butler-Turner over Hubert Minnis in the FNM leadership contest, announced in early 2017 that he would re-enter politics and was willing to work with Minnis.

Symonette was sworn in as Minister of Financial Services, Trade and Industry and immigration after regaining his seat in the 2017 general election. He served in that capacity until 1 July 2019 when he resigned. He confirmed that he would complete his tenure as MP and continue supporting the FNM in future elections, but would not seek re-election himself.
