= Patricia Elaine Joan Rodgers =

Bahamian diplomat

Patricia Elaine Joan Rodgers (born 13 July 1948) is a Bahamian diplomat who served as the permanent secretary in the Ministry of Foreign Affairs, the High Commissioner in the United Kingdom (16 May 1988 – 30 October 1992), and in Canada. In 2014, Rodgers was awarded the Janet Bostwick Medal for Women in the Foreign Service.

== Education ==
Rodgers holds a Master of Arts degree in English from the University of Aberdeen (1970), and a Diploma in International Relations from the University of the West Indies St Augustine, Trinidad (1972), and a PhD from the Graduate Institute of International Studies in Geneva (1981).

== Books ==
- Midocean archipelagos and international law: A study in the progressive development of international law. Vantage Press. 1981. ISBN 978-0533046232.
