= Mary Moseley =

- Born: 1878; Bahamas
- Died: 14 January 1960 (aged 81–82)
- Father: Alfred Edwin Moseley

Mary Moseley (1878 – 1960) was a Bahamian newspaper editor. She was the editor for 48 years of the Nassau Guardian, which her grandfather, Edwin Charles Moseley, had founded in 1844. She served as editor from 1904–1952. She was also the owner of the paper from 1907.

== Early life ==
Moseley was the daughter of Alfred Edwin Moseley and the granddaughter of Edwin Charles Moseley, who founded the Nassau Guardian. She was educated at the Church High School in Nassau and by private tutor. She was born in the Bahamas, which at time was a British colony.

== Career ==
=== The Guardian ===
The Nassau Guardian first appeared on 23 November 1844 to support the anti-slavery views of its founder, Moseley's grandfather, Edwin Charles Moseley. Moseley became editor and manager of the Nassau Guardian following the deaths of her father, Alfred Edwin Moseley and, shortly thereafter, her brother Percy in 1904.

Reportedly, she had been appointed to the editor's post "on a 'temporary basis' until a suitable male could be found to edit and manage the publishing business." In 1907, she officially became owner of the business and served as the publication's editor and owner for 48 years.

During World War I, Moseley went to England to advocate for war survivors from the West Indies, including the Bahamas. During her time abroad, Mary's brother Daniel ran the paper during her absence.

Readership wasn't large, averaging only about 300 readers a day with topics primarily covering social and legislative issues. For example, she was rigorous in covering the House of Assembly. The paper's day-to-day financial foundation was largely built on the government printing contracts that Moseley was able to win using her influential contacts. Moseley was widely known outside the Bahamas and apparently referred to, by overseas contacts, as "Mary Mo".

While looking for an editorial successor, Moseley identified a cousin, Australian, C. H. Doyle Moseley, to take her place. Doyle was a journalist who worked for The West Australian newspaper. Before the start of World War II, Doyle traveled to Nassau and joined the staff for a short time before enlisting in the Royal Australian Air Force in 1941. Unfortunately, Doyle was killed in the war in an air battle over Germany.

Mary Moseley continued her work at the paper until 1952 when she sold the enterprise to a group of Nassau businessmen. From that time on, she continued to serve as an editorial adviser.

=== Other activities ===
In 1926, Moseley published the first edition of The Bahamas Handbook featuring the island's history, geography and society.

She served as a trustee for the Nassau Public Library and Museum; she later became chair of the trusteeship committee.

== Honours ==
Moseley was named a Member of the Order of the British Empire by King George V.

== Death ==
Moseley died on 19 January 1960. She was 81. A funeral was held at Christ Church Cathedral and was well-attended.

== Works ==
- Moseley, Mary (1926). The Bahamas Handbook. Nassau, Bahamas: Nassau Guardian. OCLC 1570917.
