= Bahamas Taxi Cab Union =

Trade union in the Bahamas

- Bahamas Taxi Cab Union
- Headquarters: Nassau, Bahamas
- Location: The Bahamas
- Key people: Felton Cox, president Roscoe Weech, general secretary

Bahamas Taxi Cab Union is a trade union organizing taxi drivers in the Bahamas.

The former Governor-General of The Commonwealth of The Bahamas, Clifford Darling, was at one point a cab driver, and served as both the general secretary and president of the Bahamas Taxi Cab union.
