= Clifford Darling =

Bahamian politician (1922–2011)

The Most Honourable Sir Clifford Darling GCVO JP

5th Governor-General of the Bahamas
- In office 2 January 1992 – 2 January 1995
- Monarch: Elizabeth II
- Prime Minister: Lynden Pindling; Hubert Ingraham
- Preceded by: Sir Henry Milton Taylor
- Succeeded by: Sir Orville Turnquest

Speaker of the House of Assembly of the Bahamas
- In office 20 October 1977 – 14 November 1991
- Prime Minister: Lynden Pindling
- Preceded by: Arlington Butler
- Succeeded by: Milo Butler Jr.

Personal details
- Born: 6 February 1922 Acklins, Bahamas
- Died: 27 December 2011 (aged 89) Nassau, Bahamas
- Party: Progressive Liberal Party
- Spouse: Lady Ingrid Darling
- Children: Clifford Jr, Andrea Darling-Thompson, Sharlene Hanna, Theresa McPhee, Rushena Darling, Lakriesha Darling and Charles Darling

Sir Clifford Darling GCVO JP (6 February 1922 – 27 December 2011) was the fifth governor-general of the Bahamas from 2 January 1992 until his retirement on 2 January 1995.

== Early life and education ==
Clifford Darling was born on 6 February 1922, on Acklins Island to Charles and Aremilia Darling, He attended Acklins Public School and schools in New Providence.

Darling trained as an electrician and a barber. He migrated to Nassau before going on the Contract.

== Trade unionist ==
Darling returned to Nassau, got a job as a taxicab driver, and became an influential labor leader, serving as general secretary and president of the Bahamas Taxicab Union.

In the 1950s, Darling led successful negotiations for improved conditions for taxi drivers, culminating in the pivotal 1958 general strike.

== Political career ==
Darling, a member of the Progressive Liberal Party, served as a Senator from 1964 to 1967.

He was elected as a Member of Parliament in 1967 for the Engleston constituency. He served as Deputy Speaker of the House of Assembly from 1967 to 1969, Minister of State in 1969, Minister of Labour and Welfare in 1971 and Minister of Labour and National Insurance from 1974 to 1977, overseeing the introduction of the National Insurance programme in 1974.

Darling was Speaker of the House of Assembly from 1977 until November 1991, when he resigned in anticipation of being appointed Governor-General. He was appointed Governor-General in 1992. Darling served as the fourth Governor-General of an independent Bahamas until retiring in 1995.

== Awards and honours ==
In 1977, Darling was knighted by the Queen. In 1994, he was appointed a Knight Grand Cross of the Victorian Order.

== Death ==
He died on 27 December 2011 at the Princess Margaret Hospital after a long illness.

Government offices
Preceded by Sir Henry Taylor	Governor-General of the Bahamas; 1992–1995	Succeeded by Sir Orville Turnquest
