= Melanie Griffin =

Bahamian politician

The Honourable Melanie Griffin

Personal details
- Born: Nassau, Bahamas
- Citizenship: Bahamian
- Party: Progressive Liberal Party
- Spouse: Leon Griffin
- Children: 1
- Education: University of the Bahamas

Melanie Griffin is a politician in The Bahamas who was elected as a member of Parliament of the Bahamas for the Yamacraw Constituency, and was Minister of Social Services and Community Development. She was first appointed to the senate in 1999, where she was the only female member of the Progressive Liberal Party. She represented the Yamacraw constituency in Parliament between 2002 and 2017.

As Minister of Social Services and Community Development Griffin has enacted four major pieces of legislation – The Residential Care Facilities Act 2004, the Child Protection Act, 2007; the Domestic Violence (Protection Orders) Act, 2007 and the Persons with Disabilities (Equal Opportunities) Bill Act, 2014.

== Personal life ==
Her mother, Telator Strachan, was appointed the Senate by Lynden Pindling in 1987.
