= Geoffrey Johnstone =

Bahamian politician and lawyer

Sir Geoffrey Adams Dinwiddie Johnstone, KCMG (19 September 1927 – 4 August 2017) was a Bahamian politician and lawyer.

== Early life and education ==
Johnstone was born in Nassau, Bahamas, on 19 September 1927, the eldest son of the late Bruce Eric Johnstone and Wilhelmina Helena Aline Johnstone née Kemp.

He graduated from Queen's College secondary school, Nassau, Bahamas in September 1945 and began working an insurance agent for the British American Insurance Company.

In 1947, he enrolled in the Inns of Court School of Law and was called to the Bar of England and Wales at the Middle Temple in June 1950. He was called to the Bahamas Bar in August 1950.

== Law career ==
In August 1950, Johnstone joined the firm of Higgs & Johnson and was admitted to partnership in 1952. He became senior partner in 1968 and served in that capacity until his retirement in December 1998.

He served as president of the Bahamas Bar Association from June 1973 to June 1975 and as vice president from June 1975 to June 1976.

== Political career ==
He took an early interest in politics after his return from his studies abroad. He was elected to the House of Assembly for the Eastern District of New Providence in November 1962 and served that constituency until January 1967 when he was returned as the Member for the Montagu Constituency where he served until September 1972.

He served in the United Bahamian Party Cabinet as Minister of Road Traffic and Records from January 1964 to January 1967. In February 1970, he was appointed leader of the opposition and served in that office until July 1971.

He served as chairman of the Hotel Corporation of the Bahamas from October 1992 to December 1994, during which period the corporation was very involved in the privatization of its hotels.

He has also served as deputy to the governor general of the Bahamas on various occasions. In July 1995, he was appointed non-resident ambassador of the Bahamas to Chile, Argentina and Uruguay.

== Honours ==
Johnstone was appointed a Companion of the Most Distinguished Order of St. Michael and St. George (CMG) by Her Majesty Queen Elizabeth II on 31 December 1993 in the Queen's New Years Honours for 1994.

He was made Knight Commander of the Most Distinguished Order of St. Michael and St. George (KCMG) on 31 December 2001 in the Queen's New Years Honours for 2002.

== Personal ==
Johnstone's hobbies included boating, fishing and shooting.

He served as an elder of St. Andrew's Presbyterian Kirk from April 1963 until his death. In November 2010. At the celebration of the Kirk's 200th anniversary, he received an achievement award for outstanding service to the Kirk and its mission.

Sir Geoffrey died on 4 August 2017.
