= Labour Party (Bahamas) =

The Labour Party was a minor political party in the Bahamas. In the 1962 general elections it won a single seat, taken by Randol Fawkes. Fawkes retained his seat in the 1967 elections, in which the United Bahamian Party and the Progressive Liberal Party won 18 seats each. Although the UBP had won more votes, Fawkes supported the PLP, allowing them to form a government. Fawkes retained his seat again in the 1968 elections, but the party did not contest the 1972 elections.

The party reappeared to contest the 1987 elections, but received only 112 votes and failed to win a seat.
