= Robert Symonette =

Bahamian yachtsman and politician (1925–1998)

Speaker of the House of Assembly of the Bahamas
- In office 6 December 1962 – 9 February 1967
- Prime Minister: Roland Symonette; Lynden Pindling
- Preceded by: Asa Hubert Pritchard
- Succeeded by: Alvin Rudolph Braynen

Personal details
- Born: 31 January 1925
- Died: 1 March 1998 (aged 73)
- Party: United Bahamian Party

Robert Symonette
Personal information
- Full name: Robert Hallam Symonette
- Nickname: Bobby

Sailing career
- Sport: Sailing
- Class: 5.5m
Medal record
World Championships
Gold medal – first place	1980 Sydney	5.5m
Gold medal – first place	1986 Sydney	5.5m
Silver medal – second place	1962 Poole	5.5m
Silver medal – second place	1973 Lysekil	5.5m
Silver medal – second place	1977 Bénodet	5.5m
Bronze medal – third place	1981 Nassau	5.5m

Robert "Bobby" Hallam Symonette (31 January 1925 – 1 March 1998) was a Bahamian yachtsman, businessman and politician. Symonette was an accomplished international yachtsman. He represented the Bahamas at five Olympic Games and won one gold, three silvers, and one bronze at six World Championships. He also served as a Member of Parliament and the Speaker of the House of Assembly of the Bahamas.

== Early life and family ==
Bobby Symonette was born in Miami on 31 January 1925, into a prominent Bahamian family. His father was Sir Roland Symonette, the first Premier of the Bahama Islands and his mother, the former Thelma Bell Clepper of Andalusia, Alabama.

Symonette attended Queen's College and Bolles Military School in Florida, and the Massachusetts Institute of Technology (MIT) before enlisting in the US Navy in 1944. He also attended Tufts College.

== Sporting career ==
Symonette was an accomplished international yachtsman. He represented the Bahamas at five Olympic Games, at Melbourne in 1956, Rome in 1960, Tokyo in 1964, Mexico in 1968 and Munich in 1972.

Symonette twice won gold in the 5.5 metre keelboat event at the Sailing World Championships, in Sydney in 1980 and 1986. He also won silver at three World Championships in 1962 in Poole, Dorset, England, in 1973 in Lysekil, Sweden and in 1977 at Bénodet, France.

Symonette was a founding member of the Nassau Yacht Club and an International Yacht Racing Union judge. Symonette served as President of the Bahamas Olympic Association from 1957 to 1972. In 1977, hosted the International 5.5 Metre Class World Championship and the Scandinavian Gold Cup in the waters off Key Biscayne, FL.

== Business and political career ==
In 1952, Symonette was part of a group of business who bought the Nassau Guardian, one of the countries leading two daily newspapers. In 1956, he was the paper's president.

In 1956, Symonette was elected to the House of the Assembly. In 1967, he was the UBP representative for the constituency of Exuma. He served as Speaker of the House from 1962 to 1967. As speaker, he wrote the House's 1964 Manual of Procedure. Symonette was the Speaker of the House during the famous stoppage of Parliament when Lynden Pindling launched the speaker's mace out of the window.

In 1958, an exclusive agreement between Symonette's taxi company and the major hotels became the catalyst for the 1958 General Strike, which saw the capital shut down for 3 weeks and would lead to social change in the country.

Symonette was also the Chairman of Commonwealth Bank and Chair of the Bahamas First Insurance Company.

== Death and personal life ==
In 1961, he married Diana Critchley McKinney in Greenwich, Connecticut. Symonette died on 1 March 1998 in Nassau. He was survived by his wife and three stepsons.

Symonette's half-brother, Brent Symonette, would later become Deputy Prime Minister of the Bahamas and Deputy Leader of Free National Movement (FNM) political party.

== See also ==
- Mitchell, Carleton. "Boatman of the Month: Foreman of the Foredeck: Bobby Symonette". Popular Boating. (August 1961) 10 (2).
