= Henry Milton Taylor =

Bahamian politician (1903–1994)

The Most Honourable Sir Henry Milton Taylor JP

4th Governor-General of the Bahamas
- In office February 28, 1991 – January 2, 1992
- Monarch: Elizabeth II
- Prime Minister: Lynden Pindling
- Preceded by: Gerald Cash
- Succeeded by: Clifford Darling

Personal details
- Born: 4 November 1903 Long Island, Bahamas
- Died: 14 February 1994 (aged 90) Nassau, Bahamas

Sir Henry Milton Taylor JP (4 November 1903 – 14 February 1994) was the fourth governor-general of the Bahamas, serving from February 28, 1991, to January 2, 1992.

== Early life ==
Sir Henry, the adopted son of Joseph and Evelyn Taylor, was born on 4 November 1903, at Clarence Town, Long Island. He attended the government school on Long Island and took correspondence courses from London.

== Career ==
=== Teacher ===
He taught at public school in Roses, Long Island from 1924 to 1924, in Pompey Bay, Acklins from 1925 to 1926 and in Clarence Town, Long Island from 1933 to 1934.

=== Member of Parliament ===
In 1948, Taylor became a Member of Parliament in the Legislative Assembly of the Bahamas when he successfully contested the election for the Long Island and Ragged Island seat.

In November 1953, he co-founded and organised the Progressive Liberal Party (PLP), the country's first organised political party.

In 1956, Taylor led the first citizen's delegation to London from the Bahamas, accompanied by Lynden Pindling and Milo Butler, to discuss political conditions in the then colony.

In 1960, he led another delegation to London to champion the right of women to vote in Bahamian elections. He was accompanied by Dr. Doris Johnson and Eugenia Lockhart. Shortly after their return, the right to vote was extended to woman and exercised for the first time in the 1962 general election.

=== Semi-retirement ===
Between 1968 and 1978, Sir Henry resided in Florida where he began work on his memoirs. In February 1979, he was appointed by the Bahamas government to the post of editor of the Hansard.

=== Governor-General ===
Taylor served as Deputy to the Governor-General on several occasions between 1981 and 1988 when the Governor-General, Sir Gerald Cash, was out of the country.

On 25 June 1988, Taylor was appointed Acting Governor-General following Cash's retirement and sworn in on 26 June.

On 28 February 1991, Taylor was sworn in as Governor-General of the Commonwealth of the Bahamas, becoming the third Bahamian to hold this post. He held the post until his retirement on 1 January 1992.

== Awards and recognition ==
At the PLP's silver jubilee convention in November 1978, Taylor was honoured with a gold medallion for co-founding the party. Two years later, on 23 July 1980, Taylor was knighted by the Queen.

== Death and legacy ==
Sir Henry Milton Taylor died on 14 February 1994 at the age of 90. Twice married, Taylor had four daughters.

Government offices
Preceded by Sir Gerald Cash	Governor-General of the Bahamas; 1986-1992	Succeeded by Sir Clifford Darling
