= 1987 Bahamian general election =

- 19 June 1987

All 49 seats in the House of Assembly 25 seats needed for a majority
- Registered: 102,713
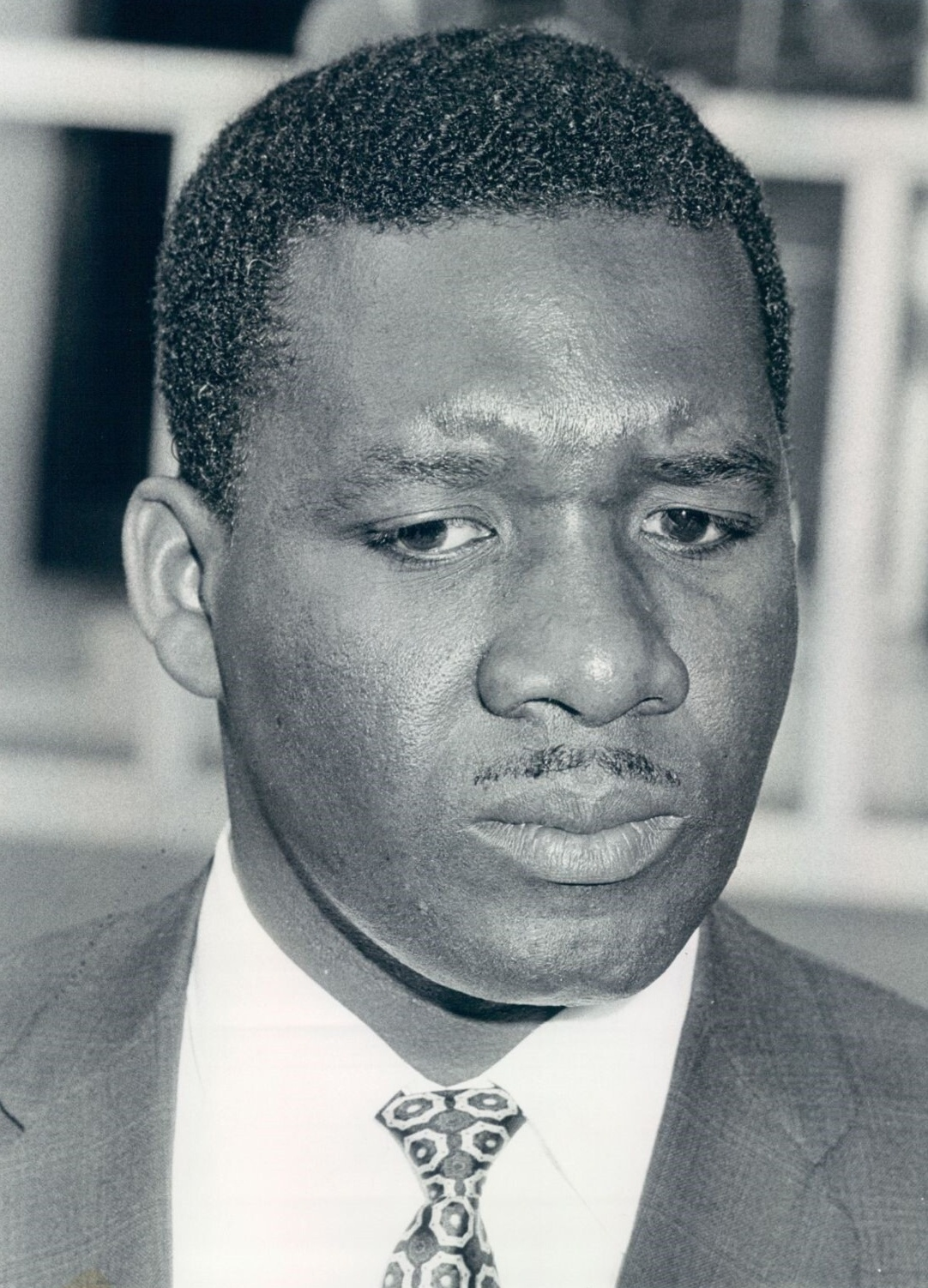

| | First party | Second party |
|---|---|---|
| Leader | Lynden Pindling | Kendal Isaacs |
| Party | PLP | FNM |
| Leader's seat | Mangrove Cay and South Andros | Delaporte |
| Last election | 56.86%, 32 seats | 41.13%, 11 seats |
| Seats won | 31 | 16 |
| Seat change | ▼1 | ▲5 |
| Popular vote | 48,339 | 39,009 |
| Percentage | 53.54% | 43.21% |
| Swing | ▼3.32pp | ▲2.08pp |
Prime Minister before election
Lynden Pindling
PLP
Elected Prime Minister
Lynden Pindling
PLP

General elections were held in the Bahamas on 19 June 1987. The result was a victory for the Progressive Liberal Party, which won 31 of the 49 seats.

== Results ==
| Party | Votes | % | Seats | +/– |
|---|---|---|---|---|
| Progressive Liberal Party | 48,339 | 53.54 | 31 | –1 |
| Free National Movement | 39,009 | 43.21 | 16 | +5 |
| Labour Party | 112 | 0.12 | 0 | New |
| Independents | 2,820 | 3.12 | 2 | +2 |
| Total | 90,280 | 100.00 | 49 | +6 |
| Registered voters/turnout | 102,713 | – | | |
Source: Nohlen
