= Randol Fawkes =

Bahamian politician

Sir Randol Francis Fawkes (20 March 1924 – 15 June 2000) was a Bahamian politician, trade unionist and lawyer.

He served as Member of Parliament for the St. Barnabas constituency and for a short time as a Cabinet Minister in the first Pindling government. Fawkes was knighted by the Queen in her 1977 Birthday Honours.

== Career ==
Fawkes is best remembered for the part he played in swinging the Bahamas' 1967 general election to bring about black "majority rule".

In 1967, the Bahamas was a British colony ruled, despite its approximately 85% black population, by a white elite known as the Bay Street Boys.

The predominantly white United Bahamian Party (UBP) government called a snap election in January 1967. Of the 38 seats contested, the ruling UBP won 18 seats and the black Progressive Liberal Party (PLP), which had previously only won six seats, won 18 seats. Alvin Braynen, an independent, won 1 seat and Fawkes, leader of the Labour Party (which had fielded four candidates), won one seat.

Fawkes and Braynen threw their votes behind the Pindling-led PLP making it the first time that the Bahamas was run by a black government ("majority rule").

Braynen became the Speaker of the House of Assembly and Fawkes the Minister of Labour and Commerce.

In 1972 Fawkes founded a new political party, the Commonwealth Labour Party but it failed to win any seats.
