= The Nassau Guardian =

Daily newspaper, Bahamas

- Type: Daily newspaper
- Owner(s): The Nassau Guardian, LLC
- Founder: Edwin Charles Moseley
- Founded: November 23, 1844; 181 years ago
- Headquarters: Nassau, Bahamas
- Country: The Bahamas
- OCLC number: 29872170
- Website: thenassauguardian.com

The Nassau Guardian is a daily newspaper in The Bahamas, based in Nassau. Its first issue was published November 23, 1844. In 1976, The New York Times described it as the largest newspaper in the Bahamas.

The paper has been described as the country's newspaper of record and one of the oldest continuously published newspapers in the Western Hemisphere.

== History ==
After the liberal Sir James Carmichael-Smyth became governor in 1829, dissent rose in Nassau over the question of emancipation and in 1831 a pro-slavery section of the community supported George Biggs in the establishment of The Argus in order to promote their anti-emancipation views.

In 1837, Edwin Charles Moseley, a journalist who had worked at The Times in London, arrived in Nassau to take up his appointment as editor of The Argus. Moseley found the semi-weekly's policies so objectionable that he refused to become its editor. On 23 November 1844, Moseley founded the Nassau Guardian. Recognizing that the newspaper industry in the Bahamas could not withstand three newspapers, Moseley acquired the Bahama Herald in 1877.

Alfred Edwin Moseley acquired the Nassau Guardian from his father, Edwin. In 1904, Alfred died and Mary Moseley became the editor and manager of the newspaper. In 1907, Mary acquired the newspaper from the estate of the late Percival James Moseley.

Mary would own and run the newspaper for 48 more years to a restricted audience with circulation seldom exceeding 300 daily. Before WWII, she had hoped to give the newspaper to her nephew, Doyle Moseley who lived in Australia at that time. Doyle would enlist in The Royal Air Force during the war and while in a raid over France in the early 1940s had been killed.

Since no one in the family was interested in the family business, she turned control and the newspaper to a group of Nassau business and professional men who offered to buy The Nassau Guardian from her. Mary worked in an advisory capacity from 1952 to 1955. Mary died on January 19, 1961, at the age of 81.

According to the newspaper's own history, the new owners tried to turn it into a propaganda medium to promote their political philosophies, however, that was not successful. In 1967, John S. Perry Jr., acquired the newspaper.

On January 20, 2002, The Nassau Guardian became a fully Bahamian–owned newspaper when John H. Perry, son of John Jr., sold his 60 percent stake in the company. The same report said the majority stake was purchased by PanEd Investments Limited. Principals in the group included attorneys Colin Callender and Emmanuel Alexiou, businessman James Campbell and financial analyst Anthony Ferguson, with the remaining shares held by other Bahamians.

In 2007, The Nassau Guardian (along with The Tribune and The Freeport News) entered a partnership for sales, purchasing and printing production, prompting public concern about potential media concentration. The companies said editorial operations would remain separate.
