= Roland Theodore Symonette =

Bahamian politician (1898–1980)

The Right Excellent Sir Roland Symonette
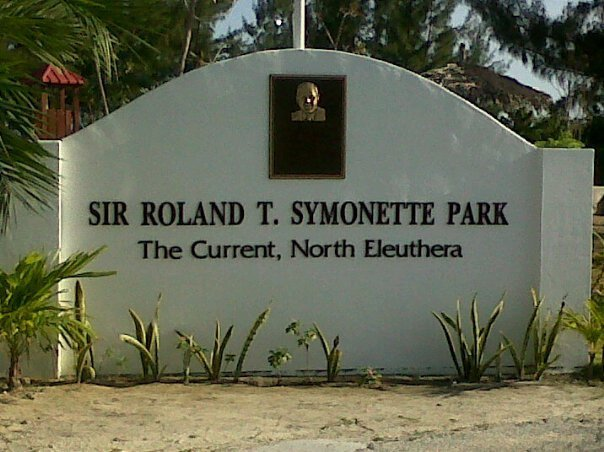
- The Sign at the entrance of the Sir. Roland Symonette Park in Current, North Eleuthera, Bahamas

1st Premier of the Bahamas
- In office 7 January 1964 – 16 January 1967
- Monarch: Elizabeth II
- Governor: Sir Ralph Grey
- Preceded by: Position established
- Succeeded by: Lynden Pindling

Personal details
- Born: 16 December 1898; Current, North Eleuthera, Crown Colony of The Bahamas
- Died: 12 March 1980 (aged 81); Nassau, The Bahamas
- Political party: United Bahamian Party (until 1971); Free National Movement (since 1971)
- Spouses: Nellie Symonette; Thelma Bell Clepper; Margaret Frances
- Relations: Edwin Symonette (father); Lavania Weech (mother)
- Children: Basil Harcourt Symonette; Robert Symonette; Zelda Symonette; Margaret Symonette; Roland Craig Symonette; Brent Symonette

Sir Roland Theodore Symonette, NH (16 December 1898 – 12 March 1980) was a Bahamian politician and the first Premier of the Bahamas after self-government was achieved in 1964. He was leader of the United Bahamian Party (UBP), which was the ruling party between 1958 and 1967.

== Early life and education ==
Roland "Pop" Symonette was one of nine children of Methodist minister Edwin Lofthouse Symonette and his wife Lavania Alethia (née Weech) on the small island settlement of Current, Eleuthera.

== Career ==
He was a school teacher early in his career. Later, he tried to make his way as a fisherman and a tomato farmer in Riviera Beach, Florida and then, during Prohibition, Symonette transported whiskey to the United States.

During prohibition, liquor was legal in the Bahamas but not in the United States. Bahamian citizens could legally buy and transport alcohol as long as they stayed outside US territorial waters. Symonette was among the most successful of Bahamian bootleggers. With the profits from bootlegging, Symonette invested in real estate, hotels, and a shipyard which built boats for the British Navy during WWII.

== Politics ==
In 1925, Symonette campaigned successfully for a seat in the Bahamas' House of Assembly. He served in the House, representing the Shirlea district until his retirement in 1977. His 53 years as a Member of Parliament is the longest record of service in the House of Assembly.

Symonette served as the head of government of the Bahama Islands from 1955 to 1964 and, in 1964, when the country achieved internal self-government, he became the first Premier of the Bahama Islands. In 1959, he was knighted by Queen Elizabeth II. After the 1967 elections, Symonette was appointed leader of the opposition in the House of Assembly of Bahamas.

== Personal life ==
Symonette was married three times. He and his first wife Gertrude Nellie had one son, Basil. He and his second wife, the former Thelma Bell Clepper of Andalusia, Alabama, had a son, Robert and a daughter, Zelda. In the late 1940s, Symonette married Canadian Margaret Frances. They had one daughter, Margaret, who died of encephalitis when she was a toddler, and two sons, Roland and Brent.

Symonette's son Basil founded the Bitter End Resort in the BVI's. His second son, Bobby, served as Speaker of the House of Assembly and his youngest son Brent Symonette later became the Deputy Prime Minister, Minister of Foreign Affairs, and Minister of Financial Services, Trade & Industry and Immigration.

== Death and legacy ==
Symonette died on 13 March 1980 at his home in Nassau. He was survived by wife, Lady Margaret Symonette three sons, and one daughter.

A community park in the settlement of Current, Eleuthera, Bahamas was named for him, a stone's throw from his birthplace, on what would have been his 111th birthday on 16 December 2009.

Symonette's portrait appears on the Bahamian $50 note. In 2018, he was posthumously awarded the Bahamian Order of National Hero (NH).

== See also ==
- "A Little Bit of Independent", Time Magazine, 24 January 1964.
- "Consultant's Paradise Lost", Time Magazine, 8 September 1967.
- "Bad News for the Bay Street Boys", Time Magazine, 20 January 1967.
