= Princess Margaret Hospital, Nassau =

Hospital in Nassau, Bahamas

Princess Margaret Hospital

Geography
- Location: Nassau, New Providence Island, The Bahamas
- Coordinates: 25.075269°N 77.335270°W

Organisation
- Type: General

Services
- Emergency department: Yes

History
- Founded: May 1953; 73 years ago

Princess Margaret Hospital or PMH is a public hospital in Nassau, Bahamas. PMH is the largest hospital in The Bahamas, providing primary, secondary, and tertiary healthcare services and one of the two most prominent hospitals, the other being Doctors Hospital. It was opened in 1952 as the Bahamas General Hospital but was renamed the Princess Margaret Hospital in 1955 to coincide with a visit from Princess Margaret, the sister of Queen Elizabeth II, future Queen of the Bahamas.

== History ==
Originally, called the Bahamas General Hospital, the cornerstone for the new hospital was laid by Governor Robert Neville in March 1952. The hospital became operational in May 1953, when the first patients were transferred from the old Prospect Hospital. The first baby was born at PMH on 21 May 1953.

The hospital was renamed in 1955 to honour a visit by Princess Margaret, sister of Queen Elizabeth II and at the time third in line to the throne. It was the first hospital to be named in her honour. Princess Margaret visited the hospital on 28 February 1955 during the last stop of her tour of the British West Indies. A ceremony unveiling the new name was held that day. The hospital's Eye Wing was completed and opened between 1960 and 1961.

During the COVID-19 pandemic in the Bahamas, Princess Margaret Hospital was placed under pressure due to a lack of bed and morgue space. As a result, they had to use tents outside for intensive care patients as well as hiring a refrigerated container for unclaimed dead bodies that could not fit in the morgue. The Public Hospital Authority appealed to Bahamans not to come to the hospital and to use local community clinics in the meantime.

== Operations ==
The hospital has approximately 405 beds, spread across adult, pediatric, and neonatal units. It also functions as a teaching hospital, supporting the training of healthcare professionals in the country.
