= Governor-General of the Bahamas =

Representative of the monarch

Governor-General of The Bahamas
- Coat of arms of The Bahamas

- Flag of the governor-general

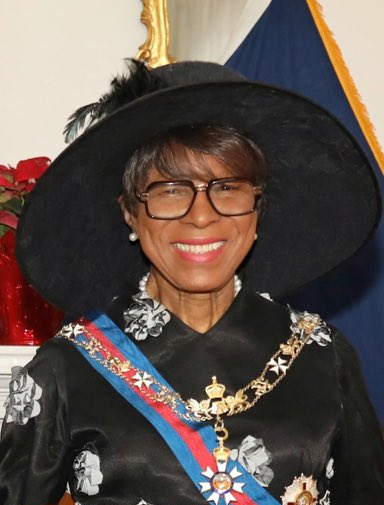
- Incumbent; Dame Cynthia A. Pratt since 1 September 2023
- Viceroy
- Style: The Most Honourable
- Residence: Government House, Nassau
- Appointer: Monarch of The Bahamas on the advice of the prime minister
- Term length: At His Majesty's pleasure
- Constituting instrument: Constitution of The Bahamas
- Formation: 10 July 1973
- First holder: Sir John Paul
- Deputy: Ruby Ann Darling
- Salary: 75,000 BSD annually
- Website: gg.gov.bs

The governor-general of The Bahamas is the representative of the Bahamian monarch, currently King Charles III, in the Commonwealth of The Bahamas. The governor-general is appointed by the monarch on the recommendation of the prime minister of The Bahamas. The functions of the governor-general include appointing ministers, judges, and ambassadors; giving royal assent to legislation passed by parliament; issuing writs for election.

In general, the governor-general observes the conventions of the Westminster system and responsible government, maintaining political neutrality, and has to always act only on the advice of the prime minister. The governor-general also has a ceremonial role: hosting events at the official residence—Government House in the capital, Nassau—and bestowing honours to individuals and groups who are contributing to The Bahamas and to their communities. When travelling abroad, the governor-general is seen as the representative of The Bahamas and its monarch. The governor-general is supported by a staff headed by the official secretary to the governor-general.

Governors-general formally serve "at the monarch's pleasure". Since 1 September 2023, the governor-general has been Dame Cynthia A. Pratt.

The office of the governor-general was created on 10 July 1973, when The Bahamas gained independence from the United Kingdom as a sovereign state and an independent constitutional monarchy. Since then, 12 individuals have served as governor-general.

== Appointment ==
External videos
- Induction of Cynthia Pratt As Governor General Source: The ZNS Network.

The governor-general is formally appointed by the monarch of the Bahamas. When a new governor-general is to be appointed, the prime minister recommends a name to the monarch, who by convention accepts that recommendation. At the installation ceremony, the new governor-general takes oaths of allegiance and of office. These oaths are administered by the chief justice of the Bahamas.

The oath for the due execution of the office of governor-general is:

"I, (name), do swear that I will well and truly serve His Majesty King Charles III in the office of Governor-General. So help me God."

== Functions ==
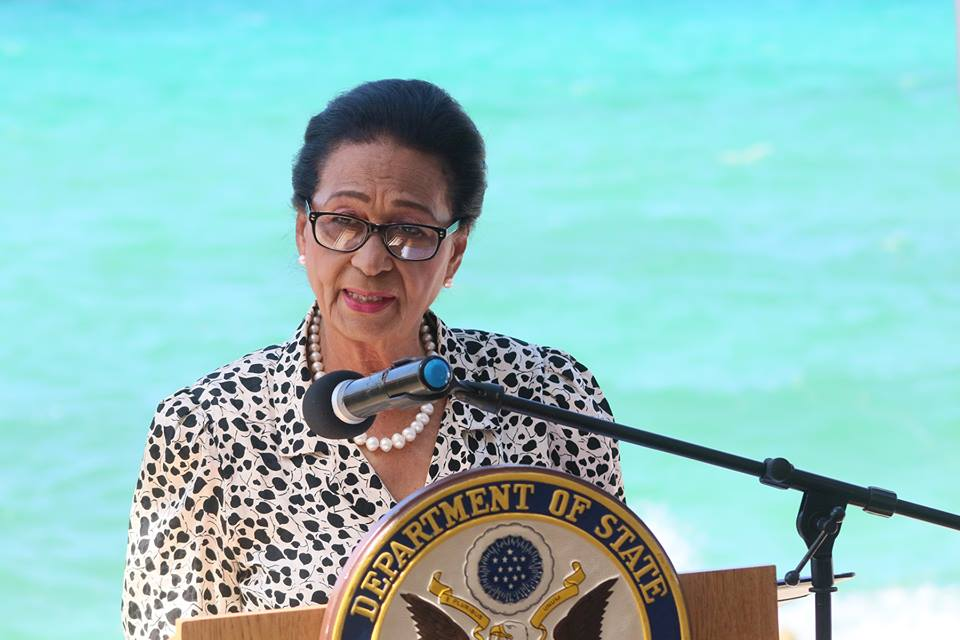
Governor-General Marguerite Pindling speaking at a US Embassy Memorial Day wreath laying ceremony in The Bahamas, 2017

The Bahamas shares the person of the sovereign equally with 14 other countries in the Commonwealth of Nations. As the sovereign works and resides predominantly outside of Bahamian borders, the governor-general's primary task is to perform the monarch's constitutional duties on their behalf. As such, the governor-general carries out their functions in the government of The Bahamas on behalf and in the name of the Sovereign.

The governor-general's powers and duties are derived from the Bahamian constitution's Section 32 to 37, which set out certain provisions relating to the governor-general.

=== Constitutional role ===
The governor-general is responsible for dissolving parliament and issues writs for new elections. After an election, the governor-general formally requests the leader of the political party which gains the support of a majority in parliament to form a government. The governor-general commissions the prime minister and appoints other ministers after the election.

The governor-general, on the Sovereign's behalf, gives royal assent to laws passed by the Parliament of The Bahamas.

The governor-general acts on the advice of the prime minister, to issue regulations, proclamations under existing laws, to appoint state judges, ambassadors and high commissioners to overseas countries, and other senior government officials.

The governor-general is also responsible for issuing Royal Commissions of Inquiry, and other matters, as required by particular legislation; and authorises many other executive decisions by ministers such as approving treaties with foreign governments.

The governor-general may, in certain circumstances, exercise without—or contrary to—ministerial advice. These are known as the reserve powers, and include:

- appointing a prime minister if an election has resulted in a 'hung parliament'.
- dismissing the prime minister who has lost the confidence of the parliament.
- dismissing any minister acting unlawfully.
- refusing to dissolve the House of Representatives despite a request from the prime minister.

=== Ceremonial role ===
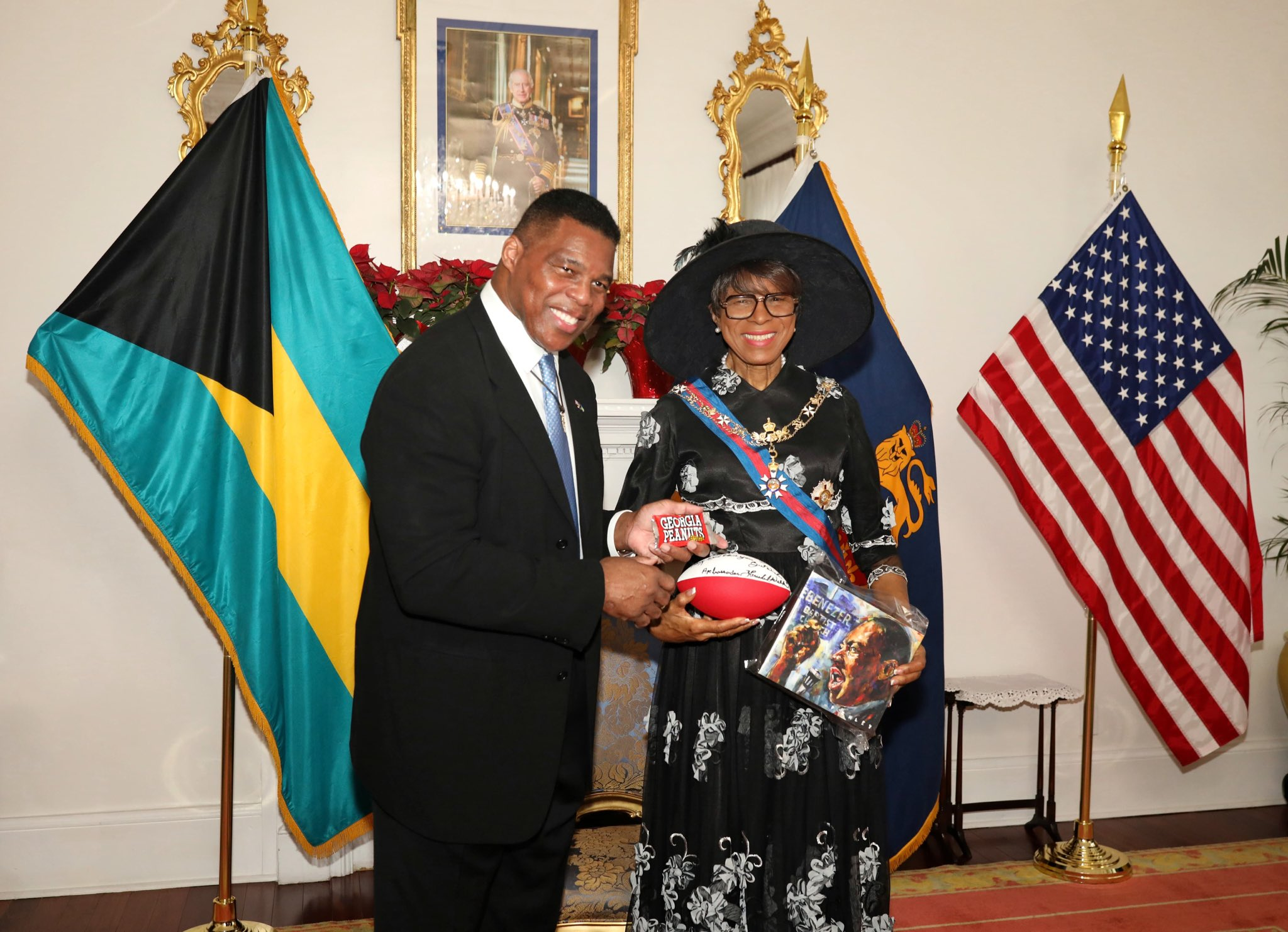
Herschel Walker, US ambassador to the Bahamas, presenting his credentials to Governor-General Cynthia Pratt, 2025

The governor-general's ceremonial duties include opening new sessions of parliament by delivering the Speech from the Throne, welcoming visiting heads of state, and receiving the credentials of foreign diplomats.

The governor-general also presents honours at investitures to Bahamians for notable service to the community, or for acts of bravery.

=== Community role ===
The governor-general provides non-partisan leadership in the community, acting as patron of many charitable, service, sporting and cultural organisations, and attending functions throughout the country.

The governor-general also encourages, articulates and represents those things that unite Bahamians together. In this role, the governor-general:

- frequently receives Bahamians on special occasions or celebrations, students of various schools, and visitors from other countries at Government House.
- attends church services, religious observances, and charitable, social, and civic events across the country.
- accepts patronage of many national, charitable, cultural, educational, sporting and professional organisations.
- issues congratulatory messages to Bahamian organisations for special anniversaries and events, such as major national or international conferences, cultural festivals and sporting championships.

== Privileges ==
Through the passage of the National Honours Act 2016, The Bahamas established seven national orders in 2016. The governor-general, serves as the Chancellor of all these orders.

=== Salary ===
The governor-general receives an annual salary of 75,000 BSD.

=== Symbols ===
Flag of the governor-general of The Bahamas

The governor-general uses a personal flag, which features a lion passant atop a St. Edward's royal crown with "Commonwealth of The Bahamas" written on a scroll underneath, all on a blue background. It is flown on buildings and other locations in The Bahamas to mark the governor-general's presence.

=== Residence ===
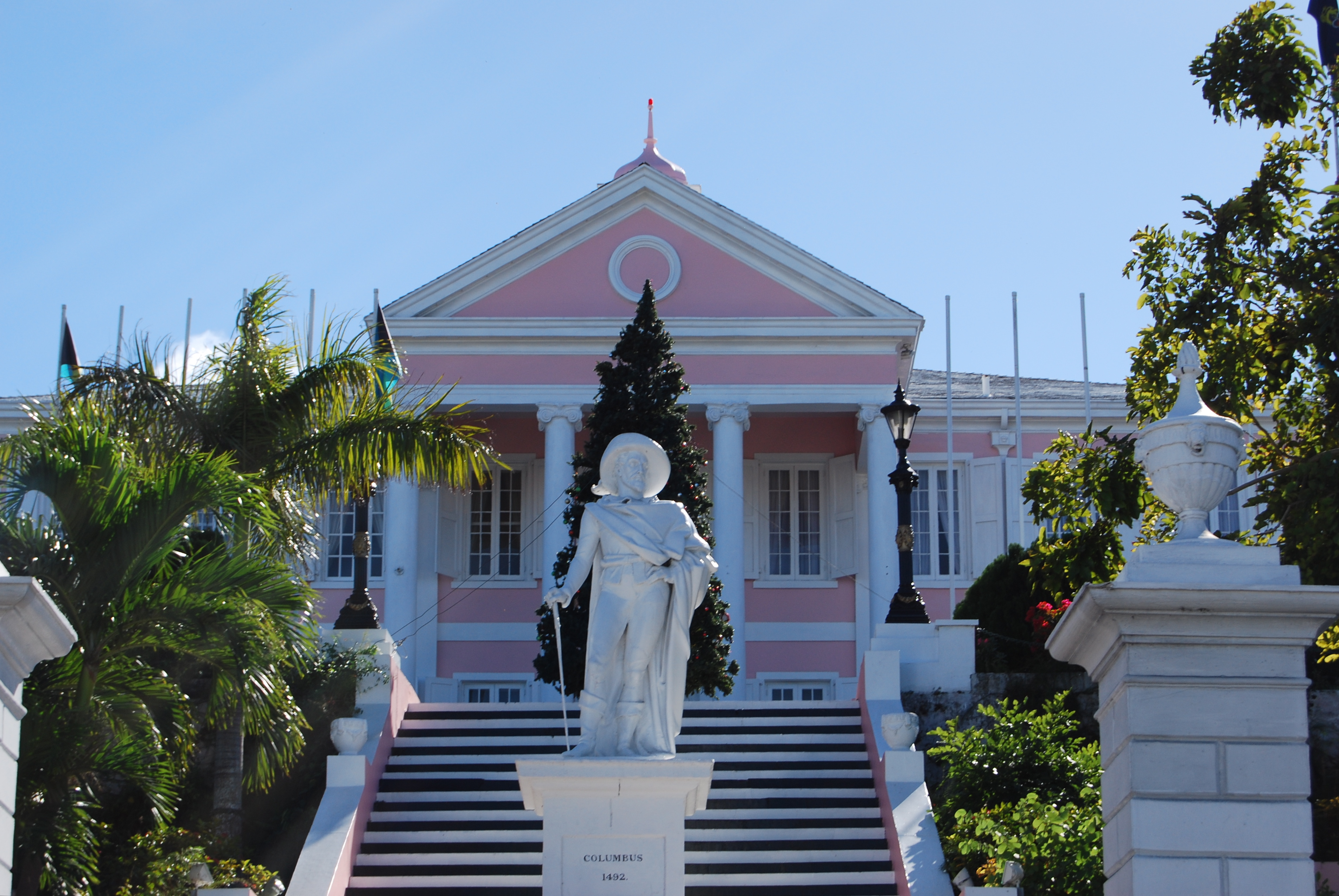
Government House, Nassau

Government House in Nassau is the official residence of the governor-general of The Bahamas.

It was built between 1803 and 1806 and has served as the official residence and office of all Bahamian governors-general since independence in 1973.

== List of governors-general ==
Following is a list of people who have served as governor-general of The Bahamas since independence in 1973.

Symbols

^† Died in office.

Denotes acting governors-general

No.	Portrait	Name (Birth–Death)	Term of office			Monarch (Reign)
No.	Portrait	Name (Birth–Death)	Took office	Left office	Time in office	Monarch (Reign)
1		Sir John Paul (1916–2004)	10 July 1973	31 July 1973	21 days	Elizabeth II (1973–2022)
2		Sir Milo Butler (1906–1979)	1 August 1973	22 January 1979^{[†]}	5 years, 174 days	Elizabeth II (1973–2022)
–		Sir Gerald Cash (1917–2003); Acting Governor-General	22 January 1979	23 September 1979	244 days	Elizabeth II (1973–2022)
3		Sir Gerald Cash (1917–2003)	23 September 1979	25 June 1988	8 years, 276 days	Elizabeth II (1973–2022)
–		Sir Henry Milton Taylor (1903–1994); Acting Governor-General	26 June 1988	28 February 1991	2 years, 247 days	Elizabeth II (1973–2022)
4		Sir Henry Milton Taylor (1903–1994)	28 February 1991	1 January 1992	307 days	Elizabeth II (1973–2022)
5		Sir Clifford Darling (1922–2011)	2 January 1992	2 January 1995	3 years, 0 days	Elizabeth II (1973–2022)
6		Sir Orville Turnquest (b. 1929)	3 January 1995	13 November 2001	6 years, 314 days	Elizabeth II (1973–2022)
–		Dame Ivy Dumont (b. 1930); Acting Governor-General	13 November 2001	1 January 2002	49 days	Elizabeth II (1973–2022)
7		Dame Ivy Dumont (b. 1930)	1 January 2002	30 November 2005	3 years, 333 days	Elizabeth II (1973–2022)
–		Paul Adderley (1928–2012); Acting Governor-General	1 December 2005	1 February 2006	62 days	Elizabeth II (1973–2022)
8		Arthur Dion Hanna (1928–2021)	1 February 2006	14 April 2010	4 years, 72 days	Elizabeth II (1973–2022)
9		Sir Arthur Foulkes (b. 1928)	14 April 2010	8 July 2014	4 years, 85 days	Elizabeth II (1973–2022)
10		Dame Marguerite Pindling (b. 1932)	8 July 2014	28 June 2019	4 years, 355 days	Elizabeth II (1973–2022)
11		Sir Cornelius A. Smith (b. 1937)	28 June 2019	31 August 2023	4 years, 65 days	
11		Sir Cornelius A. Smith (b. 1937)	28 June 2019	31 August 2023	4 years, 65 days	Charles III (2022–present)
12		Dame Cynthia A. Pratt (b. 1945)	1 September 2023	Incumbent	3 years, 6 days	Charles III (2022–present)

== See also ==
- List of governors of The Bahamas
- List of prime ministers of The Bahamas
