= Alvin Braynen =

Bahamian politician (1904–1992)

Speaker of the House of Assembly of the Bahamas
- In office 9 February 1967 – 18 October 1972
- Prime Minister: Lynden Pindling
- Preceded by: Robert Symonette
- Succeeded by: Arlington Butler

Personal details
- Born: Alvin Rudolph Braynen; 6 December 1904 Current, Eleuthera, The Bahamas
- Died: 9 October 1992 (aged 87)
- Party: United Bahamian Party

Sir Alvin Braynen was a Bahamian politician who served as Speaker of the House of Assembly from 1967 to 1972.

== Early life ==
Braynen was born on 6 December 1904 at Current on Eleuthera. He worked as consultant to Shell Oil from 1969 to 1982.

== Political Career ==
Braynen was elected to the House of Assembly in 1935, and was continuously elected for 35 years. He was a member of United Bahamian Party until 1967, when he run as independent. He was deputy speaker from 1949 to 1953 and from 1963 to 1966. He served as the Speaker of the House of Assembly from February 1967 to October 1972.

Braynen was appointed as the high commissioner for the Bahamas in London from 1973 to 1977.

== Death ==
He died on 9 October 1992.
