= United Bahamian Party =

- Leader: Roland Theodore Symonette
- Founded: 1956
- Dissolved: October 1971
- Merged into: Free National Movement
- Ideology: White minority interests

The United Bahamian Party (UBP) was a major political party in the Bahamas in the 1950s and 1960s. Representing the interests of the white oligarchy known as the Bay Street Boys, including Stafford Sands, it was the ruling party between 1958 and 1967. It was led by Roland Theodore Symonette.

== History ==
It was established in 1956 as the Christian Democratic Party to oppose the black-dominated Progressive Liberal Party, which had emerged as the largest party in the 1956 elections with six seats, although 22 MPs had been elected as independents. Following the 1958 general strike, it was renamed the United Bahamian Party. Despite receiving fewer votes than the black-dominated Progressive Liberal Party (PLP), the UBP won the 1962 general elections, largely as a result of gerrymandering. However, the 1967 elections saw a reversal in fortunes as the UBP received more votes, but won the same number of seats as the PLP. The PLP formed a government with the support of the sole Labour Party MP. Following the election the UBP accused the PLP of gerrymandering.

In early elections the following year, support for the UBP slumped and it won only seven of the 38 seats. In 1971 it merged with the Free Progressive Liberal Party, a breakaway from the ruling party, to form the Free National Movement.

== Election results ==
| Election | Votes | % | Seats |
|---|---|---|---|
| 1962 | 26,500 | 36.1% | 18 / 33 |
| 1967 | 19,408 | 45.0% | 18 / 38 |
| 1968 | 12,371 | 26.6% | 7 / 38 |
