= Milo Butler =

2nd governor-general of the Bahamas

The Most Honourable Sir Milo Butler NH GCMG GCVO

2nd Governor-General of the Bahamas
- In office 1 August 1973 – 22 January 1979
- Monarch: Elizabeth II
- Prime Minister: Lynden Pindling
- Preceded by: John Paul
- Succeeded by: Doris Louise Sands (Acting)

Personal details
- Born: Milo Boughton Butler; 11 August 1906
- Died: 22 January 1979 (aged 72)

Sir Milo Boughton Butler NH GCMG GCVO (11 August 1906 – 22 January 1979) was a Bahamian politician who served as the second governor-general of the Bahamas from 1973 to 1979. He died in office, aged 72.

== Early life and family ==
Butler was born in Nassau, The Bahamas on 11 August 1905 to George Raleigh Butler and his wife Frances. He attended the George Washington School in Florida, the public school at Rum Cay, and the Boys' Central School in Nassau. At age 17, Butler began his own grocery business. On 14 October 1928, Butler married Caroline Loretta Watson. They had seven sons and three daughters.

== Career and death ==
Butler entered electoral politics in 1936 as a member of the Progressive Liberal Party (PLP), when he unsuccessfully ran against Sir Harry Oakes in the Western District of New Providence. Although Butler was seen as a charismatic candidate who had the support of the working class voters, Oakes' team allegedly employed "questionable" means to win the election. The following year, Butler was elected to parliament following a by-election in the same constituency, relinquishing the office in 1947.

In 1956, after the government imposed a 12-minute limit on parliamentary speeches, Butler threw the Speaker's hourglass out of the window at the House of Assembly. He returned as a member of parliament for the Western District the same year, serving for a decade. From 1967 to 1973, he represented Bain Town.

After the PLP emerged victorious in the 1967 general election and formed a majority government, Butler became minister of health and welfare followed by minister of labour, agriculture and fisheries a year later. In 1970, he was appointed as minister of agriculture and fisheries, and in 1972 he became minister without portfolio. On 1 August 1973, Butler was appointed as the second governor-general of the Bahamas by Queen Elizabeth II, on the recommendation of Lynden Pindling, Prime Minister of The Bahamas and leader of the PLP. He served as governor general until his death on 22 January 1979 in Nassau.

Butler is buried at the cemetery next to the nineteenth-century St. Matthew's Anglican Church on Church and Shirley Streets.

On 14 November 1991, his son Milo Butler Jr. became Speaker of Parliament.

== Recognition ==
In June 1972, Butler was honoured as a National Hero of the Bahamas following a Special Resolution by the Honourable House of Assembly. In 1973, he was appointed as a Knight Grand Cross of the Order of St Michael and St George (GCMG) by Queen Elizabeth II. In February 1975, following the Queen's visit to Nassau, he was made a Knight Grand Cross of the Royal Victorian Order (GCVO). A bronze statue of Butler designed by Bahamian sculptor Randolph Johnson was unveiled on 22 January 1986 at Rawson Square in downtown Nassau. In 2018, he was posthumously awarded the Bahamian Order of National Hero (NH).

Government offices
Preceded by Sir John Warburton Paul	Governor-General of the Bahamas; 1973–1979	Succeeded by Sir Gerald Cash
