= Progressive Liberal Party =

- Abbreviation: PLP
- Leader: Philip Davis
- Chairperson: Fred Mitchell
- Deputy leader: Chester Cooper
- Founder: William Cartwright; Cyril Stevenson; Henry Milton Taylor
- Founded: 23 November 1953; 72 years ago
- Headquarters: Sir Lynden Pindling Centre, Farrington Road, Nassau
- Youth wing: Progressive Young Liberals
- Ideology: Populism
- Political position: Centre-left
- Colours: Gold, Blue
- Slogan: "Believe in the Bahamas"
- House of Assembly: 33 / 41
- Senate: 12 / 16

Party flag

Website
- yourplp.org

The Progressive Liberal Party (PLP) is a populist and centre-left political party in The Bahamas. Founded in 1953, it was the country's first national political party and is one of the two major parties in Bahamian politics, alongside the Free National Movement (FNM). The PLP led the movement for majority rule in the 1950s and 1960s and first came to power after the 1967 Bahamian general election.

Under Lynden Pindling, the PLP governed The Bahamas from 1967 to 1992 and oversaw the country's transition to independence in 1973. The party later returned to power under Perry Christie from 2002 to 2007 and again from 2012 to 2017. After a major defeat in the 2017 Bahamian general election, it rebuilt under Philip Davis, returned to government in the 2021 Bahamian general election, and won a second consecutive term in the 2026 Bahamian general election.

== Ideology and political position ==
The Progressive Liberal Party is generally described as a centre-left party. Bahamian politics has traditionally been dominated by the centre-left PLP and the centre-right Free National Movement.

The party emerged as a political vehicle for Bahamians of African descent in opposition to the colonial ruling group and became the principal party of majority rule in the 1950s and 1960s. In its early period in government, the PLP advocated stronger state control of the economy, greater Bahamian ownership of business enterprises and the replacement of foreign workers by Bahamians. This policy orientation, often associated with Bahamianization, gave the party a political identity rooted in majority rule and Bahamian economic nationalism.

In the wider Commonwealth Caribbean context, party competition has often been shaped less by detailed ideological programmes than by majoritarian electoral systems, intense partisanship, weak regulation of party and campaign funding and competition over access to state resources. In the Davis period, the PLP's electoral platform emphasized cost-of-living issues, economic recovery, health care and tax policy, including a 2021 pledge to reduce value-added tax and increase revenue by taxing the wealthiest, and 2026 campaign themes including affordability, housing and wages.

== History ==
=== Founding and first seats (1953–1956) ===
The Progressive Liberal Party was founded on 23 November 1953 by William Cartwright, Cyril Stevenson and Henry Milton Taylor. It was the first national political party in The Bahamas. Cartwright had been elected to the House of Assembly for Cat Island in 1949 and later worked as a magazine publisher.

Earlier in 1953, Cartwright, who owned The Bahamas Review, and Stevenson, then a journalist at the Nassau Guardian, travelled to London to cover the coronation of Elizabeth II. While there, they met representatives of the British Labour Party. They also visited Jamaica and met members of the Jamaica Labour Party and the People's National Party. When the PLP was organized later that year, Taylor became chairman, Cartwright treasurer and Stevenson secretary-general.

In 1954, Stevenson became editor and publisher of The Nassau Herald, which was associated with the early PLP and its opposition to the governing United Bahamian Party. Lynden Pindling, then a newly qualified lawyer returning from England, joined the party a few months after its formation.

The PLP emerged in a colonial political system in which the franchise was still restricted and property-based plural voting remained in place. Its founders organized the party in opposition to racial discrimination, corruption and poor administration, and the party called for political and social reform, improvements in education and expansion of the franchise, including votes for women.

In the 1956 general election, the PLP won about one third of the popular vote and six seats in the House of Assembly. The elected group, later known as the "Magnificent Six", consisted of Stevenson, Pindling, Randol Fawkes, Milo Butler, Sammy Isaacs and Clarence A. Bain. Their election gave the PLP a permanent parliamentary presence and created the first organized opposition bloc in the House of Assembly.

=== Pindling's opposition (1956–1967) ===
After the 1956 election, Pindling emerged as the PLP's parliamentary leader and became the central figure in the party's challenge to the colonial political order. The passage of an anti-discrimination resolution in 1956 increased political awareness among black Bahamians, while the 1958 general strike, led by Fawkes and trade unionists, strengthened the party's association with labour protest and political reform.

The widened franchise did not immediately bring the PLP to power. In the 1962 Bahamian general election, the party won the largest share of the vote but was defeated in seats, a result it attributed to unfair constituency boundaries. Opposition to malapportionment became central to the party's politics in the years that followed.

The conflict over constituency boundaries reached a turning point on 27 April 1965, an episode later known as Black Tuesday, when Pindling threw the Speaker's mace out of a House of Assembly window in protest against the alleged unfairness of constituency boundaries. The PLP then boycotted the House for almost nine months. The action caused a split in the party, as three House members broke away to form the National Democratic Party. The remaining PLP members returned to the House in 1966 in anticipation of the next general election. New boundaries were drawn by 1967.

=== First government and independence (1967–1973) ===
The PLP's campaign against minority rule culminated in the 1967 Bahamian general election, when it won 18 of the 38 seats in the House of Assembly, tying the governing United Bahamian Party (UBP). With the backing of Labour leader Randol Fawkes and independent member Alvin Braynen, Pindling was invited by Governor Sir Ralph Grey to form a government. The result is widely regarded as the arrival of majority rule in The Bahamas and produced the country's first black-led government.

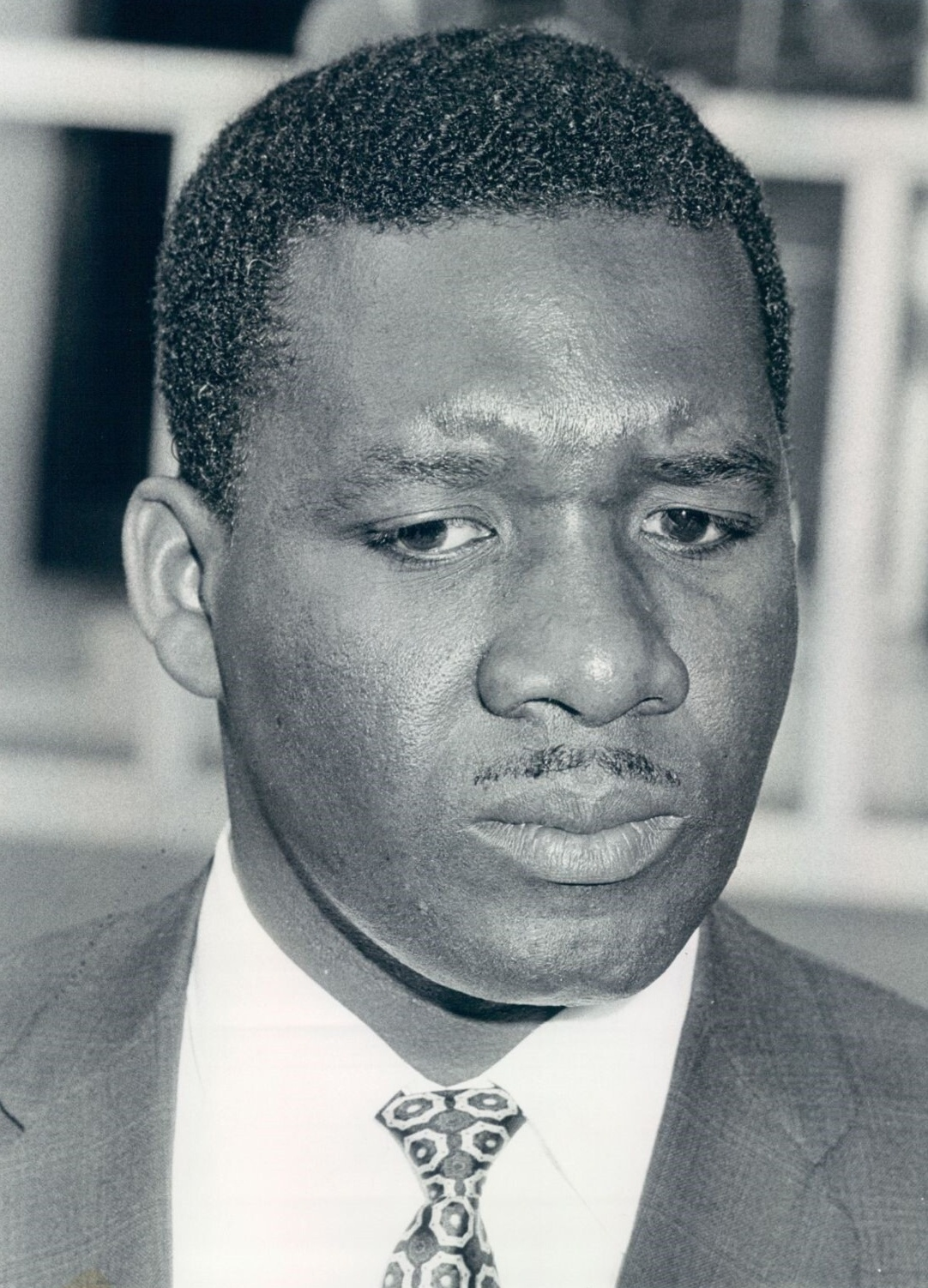
Lynden Pindling in 1971

Fawkes became Minister of Labour and Commerce, while Braynen became Speaker of the House of Assembly. Pindling became Premier and, after independence, the country's first prime minister.

The new government sought a stronger mandate in the early general election of April 1968. The PLP won 29 seats, consolidating its hold on power. A constitutional conference later that year led to the 1969 Constitution, which replaced the office of Premier with that of Prime Minister and brought the country close to full internal self-government, although external affairs, defence and internal security remained in the governor's hands.

PLP rule was nevertheless marked by internal strain. In 1970, eight government members were suspended from the party and went on to form the Free Progressive Liberal Party, helping to reorganize the opposition. By 1971–1972, opposition forces had regrouped under the banner of the Free National Movement (FNM), which drew support from the Free PLP, the remnants of the UBP and the small National Democratic Party.

The question of early independence became the central issue of the 1972 Bahamian general election. The PLP won 29 of the 38 seats in the House of Assembly and treated the result as a mandate to complete the constitutional transition. After the election, the government published a white paper on independence, and both houses of the legislature passed resolutions requesting independence. A conference held in London in December 1972 agreed the principles of the independence constitution, and The Bahamas became independent on 10 July 1973 as the Commonwealth of The Bahamas.

=== Pindling's premiership (1973–1992) ===
Following independence, the PLP remained the dominant governing party of the new Bahamian state. Under Pindling, the party combined its majority-rule legacy with a programme of national development that favoured stronger state control of the economy, greater Bahamian ownership of business enterprises and the replacement of foreign workers by Bahamians.

The party maintained its dominance in the first two post-independence general elections. In 1977, the first parliamentary election held after independence, the PLP won 30 of the 38 seats in the House of Assembly, defeating a divided opposition. In 1982, after the House was enlarged to 43 seats, the PLP won 32 seats and secured its fifth successive general-election victory.

The later years of Pindling's premiership were increasingly shaped by allegations of corruption and the effects of drug trafficking on Bahamian public life. An official Commission of Inquiry into drug trafficking and government corruption reported in the mid-1980s that corruption existed in the Royal Bahamas Police Force, among some customs and immigration officers and at cabinet level. A later scholarly summary stated that the inquiry found serious corruption in government institutions and questionable practices involving Pindling, but no firm evidence that he had been on a drug payroll.

The controversy also affected the party's internal politics. Deputy prime minister Arthur Hanna left the cabinet after confronting Pindling over the corruption issue, and Pindling dismissed two Hanna allies, Perry Christie and Hubert Ingraham. Ingraham, who remained in Parliament, publicly called on the party to purge those who had brought it into disrepute. He later retained his seat as an independent in 1987, joined the Free National Movement in 1990 and served as leader of the opposition from 1990 to 1992.

The PLP nevertheless remained in office after the 1987 Bahamian general election, winning 31 of the 49 seats. The campaign was dominated by corruption allegations related to drug trafficking, while the FNM also pointed to high unemployment and rising drug use. By 1992, recession, high unemployment and opposition attacks on mismanagement and waste had weakened the party's hold on power. In the 1992 Bahamian general election, the FNM won 33 of the 49 seats in the House of Assembly, reducing the PLP to 16 seats and ending Pindling's 25 years as head of government.

=== Christie's leadership (1992–2017) ===
After the 1992 defeat, the PLP entered its first period in opposition since 1967. In the 1997 Bahamian general election, called early after the House of Assembly had been reduced from 49 to 40 seats, the party suffered a further setback, winning six seats. The campaign took place under the shadow of corruption allegations against the former PLP government, while the governing FNM campaigned on its economic record and promises to crack down on crime and expand employment opportunities.

Pindling resigned as leader of the opposition and retired from politics later that year. He was succeeded by Perry Christie, a former PLP minister who had been dismissed from Pindling's cabinet during the party's internal conflict of the 1980s. In the 2002 Bahamian general election, the PLP won 29 of the 40 seats in the House of Assembly, ending ten years of FNM government. The outgoing FNM was credited with promoting economic development and restoring the country's international reputation, but was also criticised for offering extensive concessions to attract foreign investment. The campaign was marked by mutual accusations over corruption and drug money.

Christie's first administration lasted one term. The PLP was voted out in the 2007 Bahamian general election, when the FNM won 23 of the 41 seats and the PLP fell to 18. The campaign was dominated by economic issues and political scandals, including controversy surrounding the residency application of Anna Nicole Smith. The FNM accused the Christie government of corruption and vote-buying, while the PLP denied the allegations.

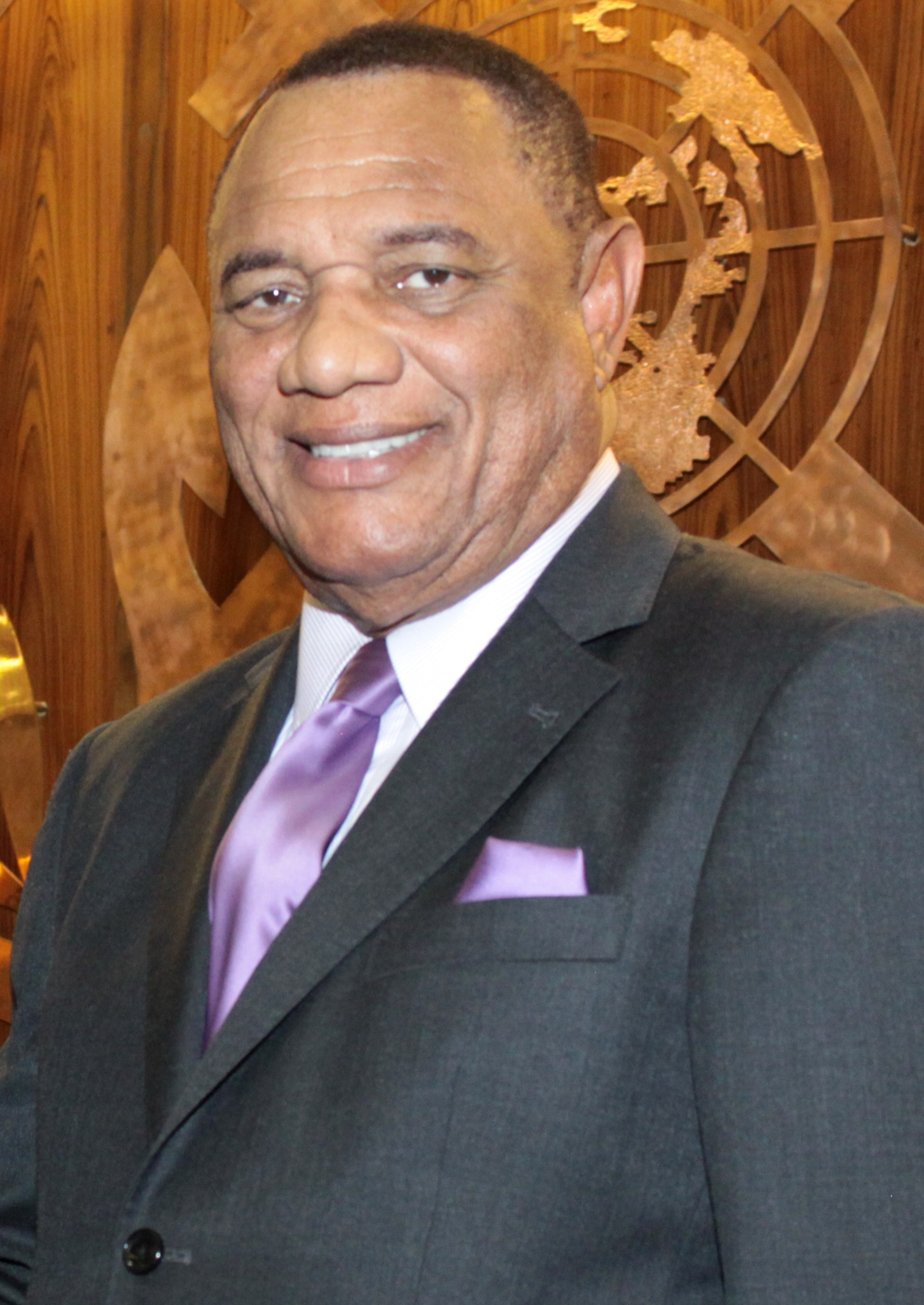
Perry Christie in 2013

The party returned to office in the 2012 Bahamian general election, winning 29 of the 38 seats. The PLP criticised the FNM government, led by Hubert Ingraham, for failing to stimulate an economy that had not recovered from the global financial crisis. Christie was sworn in for a second, non-consecutive term on 8 May 2012. Ingraham announced that he would retire from front-line politics.

Christie's second administration governed during a period of weak economic performance. In 2013, The Bahamas began to recover from a prolonged period of low growth and high indebtedness, but the economy stalled again, with GDP flat in 2013, shrinking in 2014–2015 and growing only marginally in 2016. The government moved toward implementation of a National Health Insurance programme, while the repeatedly delayed opening of the Chinese-funded Baha Mar resort became a major political issue. Accusations of corruption accompanied the delays to the project, and in 2015 Christie said the government would seek to take control of the unfinished resort, describing its completion as a matter of national importance.

The PLP also faced scrutiny over its relationship with Canadian fashion executive Peter Nygård. In 2013, Christie rejected claims of an improper relationship between the PLP and Nygård and said Nygård's stem-cell research proposal would face the same scrutiny as other applications. In 2016, he denied allegations of a quid pro quo involving Nygård and the PLP, although he did not deny that Nygård had given the party $5 million.

By the 2017 Bahamian general election, the PLP's campaign was overshadowed by corruption scandals and the delayed opening of the Baha Mar resort. The FNM, led by Hubert Minnis, won 35 of the 39 seats in the House of Assembly and reduced the PLP to four seats. Christie himself lost the Centreville seat he had held since 1977, bringing his parliamentary career to an end.

=== Davis' leadership (2017–present) ===
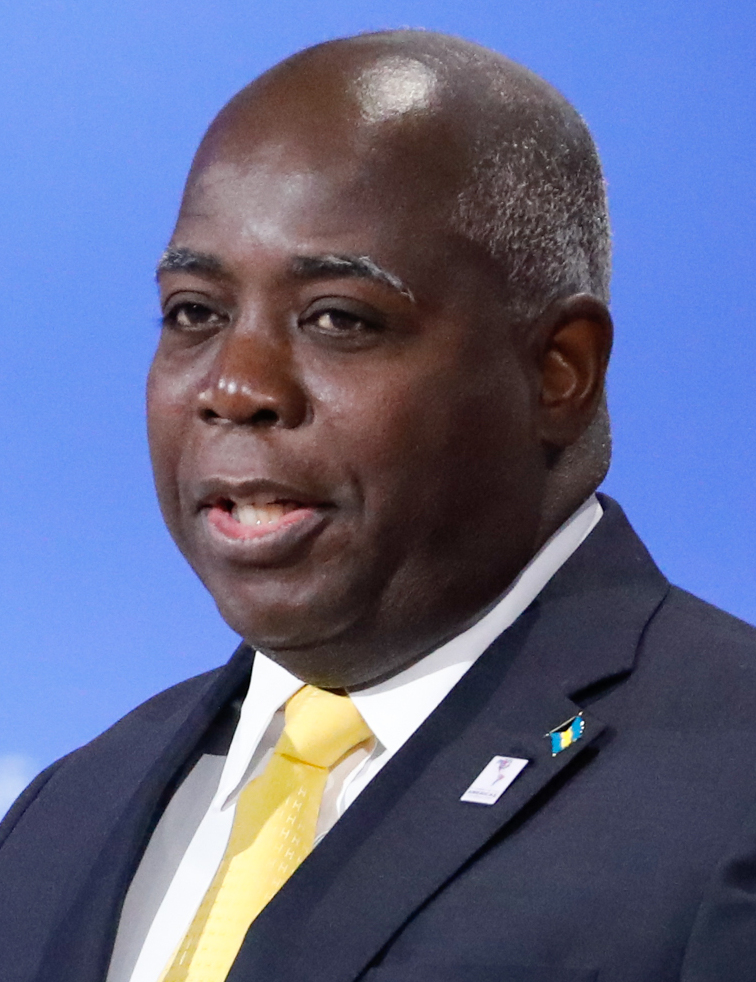
Philip Davis in 2022

Christie resigned as party leader after the 2017 election, and former deputy prime minister Philip "Brave" Davis became interim leader. At the party's national convention in October 2017, Davis was elected leader, with Chester Cooper elected deputy leader and Fred Mitchell elected chairman.

Under Davis, the PLP reorganized after its defeat. At the party's 2019 convention, Davis and Cooper were returned unopposed as leader and deputy leader, respectively, after party officials argued that a leadership contest would be divisive ahead of the next general election.

The PLP returned to power in the 2021 Bahamian general election, which was held early amid the COVID-19 pandemic. The party won 32 of the 39 seats in the House of Assembly, defeating Minnis' FNM government. The campaign focused on the pandemic and the economy, while the PLP also promised to reduce value-added tax and raise revenue by taxing the wealthiest. Davis was sworn in as prime minister on 18 September 2021.

Davis called an early general election for 12 May 2026, several months before the end of the parliamentary term. The PLP won the 2026 election, securing 33 of the 41 constituencies, while the FNM won eight. The result gave Davis and the PLP a second consecutive term in office, the first back-to-back general-election victory by a Bahamian party since 1997. Cooper, the PLP deputy leader, was also re-elected to Parliament.

== Election results ==
Election	Party leader	Votes	%	Seats	+/–	Position	Government
1962	Lynden Pindling	32,261	43.9	8 / 33	▲8	2nd	Opposition
1967	Lynden Pindling	18,452	42.8	18 / 38	▲10	▲1st	Minority government
1968	Lynden Pindling	29,156	66.5	29 / 38	▲11	1st	Supermajority government
1972	Lynden Pindling	29,628	59.0	29 / 38	0	1st	Supermajority government
1977	Lynden Pindling	35,090	54.7	30 / 38	▲1	1st	Supermajority government
1982	Lynden Pindling	42,995	56.9	32 / 43	▲2	1st	Supermajority government
1987	Lynden Pindling	48,339	53.5	31 / 49	▼1	1st	Majority government
1992	Lynden Pindling	50,258	44.7	16 / 49	▼15	▼2nd	Opposition
1997	Perry Christie	49,932	41.9	6 / 40	▼10	2nd	Opposition
2002	Perry Christie	66,901	51.8	29 / 40	▲23	▲1st	Supermajority government
2007	Perry Christie	64,637	47.0	18 / 41	▼11	▼2nd	Opposition
2012	Perry Christie	75,815	48.6	29 / 38	▲11	▲1st	Supermajority government
2017	Perry Christie	59,164	37.0	4 / 39	▼25	▼2nd	Opposition
2021	Philip Davis	66,407	52.5	32 / 39	▲28	▲1st	Supermajority government
2026	Philip Davis	71,908	51.2	33 / 41	▲1	1st	Supermajority government
