= 2022 in the Bahamas =

- Decades: 2000s; 2010s; 2020s
- See also: History of the Bahamas; List of years in the Bahamas

This article lists events from the year 2022 in The Bahamas.

== Incumbents ==
- Monarch: Elizabeth II (until 8 September), then Charles III
- Governor-General: Cornelius A. Smith
- Prime Minister: Philip Davis

== Events ==
- 1 January – New Year Honours
- 7 June - The Bahamas report their first suspected cases of monkeypox.
- 1 July – The Bahamas confirms its first case of monkeypox.
- 24 July – At least 17 Haitian migrants are killed and 25 others are rescued when their boat capsizes off New Providence, Bahamas.
- 8 September – Accession of Charles III as King of the Bahamas following the death of Queen Elizabeth II.
- 11 September – Charles III is officially proclaimed King of the Bahamas at the Parliament Square in Nassau.
- 19 September – A national holiday is observed on the day of the funeral of Elizabeth II, Queen of the Bahamas. Governor-General Sir Cornelius A. Smith and Prime Minister Philip Davis attend the funeral of Elizabeth II.
- 2 October – A state memorial service for Elizabeth II, Queen of the Bahamas, takes place at Christ Church Cathedral in Nassau.
- 12 December – Bahamian authorities arrest FTX founder Sam Bankman-Fried and begin the process of extraditing him to the United States.

== Deaths ==
- 6 January – Sidney Poitier, 94, Bahamian-American actor (In the Heat of the Night, Lilies of the Field, Guess Who's Coming to Dinner), Oscar winner (1963).
- 10 February - Sir Godfrey Kelly, 93, Olympic sailor (1960, 1964, 1968, 1972)
- 28 March - Anita Doherty, 73, athlete, educator and philanthropist
- 3 September – Shavez Hart, 29, Olympic sprinter (2016)
- 8 September - Elizabeth II, 96, Queen of the Bahamas

== See also ==
- List of years in the Bahamas
- COVID-19 pandemic in the Bahamas
- 2022 Atlantic hurricane season
- 2022 in the Caribbean
