= 2020 in the Bahamas =

- Decades: 2000s; 2010s; 2020s
- See also: History of the Bahamas; List of years in the Bahamas

This article lists events from the year 2020 in The Bahamas.

== Incumbents ==
- Monarch: Elizabeth II
- Governor-General: Cornelius A. Smith
- Prime Minister: Hubert Minnis

== Events ==
- 15 March - Acting Minister of Health Jeffrey Lloyd announced the country's first confirmed COVID-19 case, a 61-year-old female.
- March 20 - Prime Minister Hubert Minnis announced a 9 p.m. to 5 a.m. curfew, restrictions on private gatherings, and closure of most in-person businesses, with limited hours for food stores and farmers' markets, pharmacies, gas stations, laundromats, banks, construction, and restaurants (limited to take-out only). Essential workers for the government, utilities, and media were exempted, as were health care providers and suppliers. The airport remained open, but only essential travel was allowed on public buses.
- April 19 - The prime minister announced that wearing a mask or covering one's face with clothing is mandatory in public. Employers must provide their employees who are serving the general public with masks.
- July 19 - Prime Minister Hubert Minnis announced that the Bahamas would close its borders to travelers from the United States, effective July 23.
- July 20 - A 7 p.m. to 5 a.m. curfew begins in Grand Bahama, as part of coronavirus quarantine efforts.

== See also ==
- List of years in the Bahamas
- 2020 in the Caribbean
- COVID-19 pandemic in the Bahamas
- 2020 Atlantic hurricane season
