= 2021 in the Bahamas =

- Decades: 2000s; 2010s; 2020s
- See also: History of the Bahamas; List of years in the Bahamas

This article lists events from the year 2021 in The Bahamas.

== Incumbents ==
- Monarch: Elizabeth II
- Governor-General: Cornelius A. Smith
- Prime Minister: Philip Davis

== Events ==
- 1 January – New Year Honours
  - Dr. Merceline Dahl-Regis is awarded the Most Distinguished Order of Saint Michael and Saint George for services to Public and Community health.
- 10 March – Authorities worry about an increase in migrants from Haiti and Cuba. The skipper of a raft from Cuba is arrested for human trafficking after his raft explodes, leaving one dead and five missing (including a 28-year-old woman and her two children, 4 and 6). Twenty others were rescued; three of the rescuers had to be treated in a Bahamian hospital for sunburn.

== Deaths ==
- 17 March – Ed Armbrister, 72, baseball player (Cincinnati Reds); complications from diabetes.

== See also ==
- List of years in the Bahamas
- 2021 in the Caribbean
- COVID-19 pandemic in the Bahamas
- 2021 Atlantic hurricane season
