= 2026 in the Bahamas =

- Decades: 2000s; 2010s; 2020s
- See also: History of the Bahamas; List of years in the Bahamas

This article lists events from the year 2026 in The Bahamas.

== Incumbents ==
- Monarch: Charles III
- Governor-General: Cynthia A. Pratt
- Prime Minister: Philip Davis

== Events ==
- 12 May – 2026 Bahamian general election: The ruling Progressive Liberal Party wins a majority of seats in the House of Assembly.
- 14 May – Philip Davis is inaugurated for a second term as prime minister.
- 8 June – Five cruise ship passengers from the United States are arrested in Nassau after figuring in an altercation with other cruise ship passengers and police.
- 24 July – The United States imposes a 12.5% tariff on the Bahamas, citing the presence of alleged forced labour in the supply chain.
- 28–29 October – King Charles III makes a royal visit to the Bahamas.

== Holidays ==
- 1 January – New Year's Day
- 10 January – Majority Rule Day
- 3 April – Good Friday
- 6 April – Easter Monday
- 25 May – Whit Monday
- 5 June – Randol Fawkes Day
- 10 July – Independence Day
- 3 August – Emancipation Day
- 12 October – National Heroes' Day
- 25 December – Christmas Day
- 26 December – Boxing Day

== See also ==
- List of years in the Bahamas
- 2026 Atlantic hurricane season
- 2026 in the Caribbean
