= 2023 in the Bahamas =

- Decades: 2000s; 2010s; 2020s
- See also: History of the Bahamas; List of years in the Bahamas

This article lists events from the year 2023 in The Bahamas.

== Incumbents ==
- Monarch: Charles III
- Governor-General: Cornelius A. Smith (until 31 August), Cynthia A. Pratt (from 1 September)
- Prime Minister: Philip Davis

== Deaths ==
- 17 February – George Myers, 83, vice president of Resorts International (1977–1992).
- 25 September – Obie Wilchcombe, 64, politician.

== See also ==
- List of years in the Bahamas
- COVID-19 pandemic in the Bahamas
- 2023 Atlantic hurricane season
- 2023 in the Caribbean
