= 2000 in the Bahamas =

- Decades: 1980s; 1990s; 2000s; 2010s; 2020s
- See also: History of the Bahamas; List of years in the Bahamas

This article lists events from the year 2000 in The Bahamas.

== Incumbents ==
- Monarch: Elizabeth II
- Governor-General: Sir Orvile Turnquest
- Prime Minister: Hubert Ingraham

== Deaths ==
- January 6 - David Mitchell, convicted murderer

== See also ==
List of years in the Bahamas

== Links ==
Media related to 2000 in the Bahamas at Wikimedia Commons
