= 2025 in the Bahamas =

- Decades: 2000s; 2010s; 2020s
- See also: History of the Bahamas; List of years in the Bahamas

This article lists events from the year 2025 in The Bahamas.

== Incumbents ==
- Monarch: Charles III
- Governor-General: Cynthia A. Pratt
- Prime Minister: Philip Davis

== Events ==
- January 4 – The 2025 Bahamas Bowl at Thomas Robinson Stadium, Nassau is held, The Buffalo Bulls win.

== Holidays ==
- 1 January – New Year's Day
- 10 January – Majority rule Day
- 18 April – Good Friday
- 21 April – Easter Monday
- 6 June – Randol Fawkes Day
- 9 June – Whit Monday
- 10 July – Independence Day
- 4 August – Emancipation Day
- 13 October – National Heroes' Day
- 25 December – Christmas Day
- 26 December – Boxing Day

== Deaths ==
- 28 September – Vaughn Miller, 64, MP (since 2017) and environment minister (since 2021).
- 14 October – Drexel Gomez, 88, Anglican prelate, bishop of Barbados (1972–1992) and archbishop of the West Indies (1997–2009).

== See also ==
- List of years in the Bahamas
- 2025 Atlantic hurricane season
- 2025 in the Caribbean
