= 2018 in the Bahamas =

- Decades: 1990s; 2000s; 2010s; 2020s
- See also: History of the Bahamas; List of years in the Bahamas

This article lists events from the year 2018 in the Bahamas.

== Incumbents ==
- Monarch: Elizabeth II
- Governor-General: Marguerite Pindling
- Prime Minister: Hubert Minnis

== Events ==
- 21 December – The 2018 Bahamas Bowl

== Deaths ==
- 24 February – Durward Knowles, sailor, Olympic champion (b. 1917).
- 28 June – Elisha Obed, boxer (b. 1951).
- 25 October – Bradley Roberts, politician (b. 1943).

== See also ==
- List of years in the Bahamas

== Links ==
Media related to 2018 in the Bahamas at Wikimedia Commons
