= 2001 in the Bahamas =

- Decades: 1980s; 1990s; 2000s; 2010s; 2020s
- See also: History of the Bahamas; List of years in the Bahamas

This article lists events from the year 2001 in The Bahamas.

== Incumbents ==
- Monarch: Elizabeth II
- Governor-General: Sir Orvile Turnquest (until November 13); Dame Ivy Dumont (Acting from November 13 until December 31)
- Prime Minister: Hubert Ingraham

== Events ==
=== August ===
August 25 - Abaco Islands plane crash

== See also ==
List of years in the Bahamas
