= Lyford Cay =

Bahamian residential community

- Unincorporated community
- Interactive map of Lyford Cay
- Coordinates: 25°01′45″N 77°31′20″W
- Country: The Bahamas
- Island: New Providence
- Supervisory district: Killarney
- Time zone: UTC-5 (Eastern (EST))
  - Summer (DST): UTC-4 (EDT)
- Area code: 242
- Website: lyfordcay.com

Lyford Cay is a private gated community located on the western tip of New Providence island in the Bahamas. Considered one of the world's wealthiest and most exclusive neighbourhoods, it contains approximately 450 homes.

== History ==
The former cay that lent its name to the community is named after Captain William Lyford Jr., a mariner of note in Colonial and Revolutionary times, and is built on a 448-acre (181 ha) grant he received for his services as a Loyalist in the American Revolutionary War. Captain Lyford also received a 92-acre (37 ha) grant on Cat Island for playing a key role in Andrew Deveaux’s raid of April 1783 that drove the Spanish from Nassau.

The Lyford Cay Club was built during the latter part of the 1950s by prominent Canadian businessman Edward Plunkett Taylor, who bought the land in 1954 from Bahamian developer Sir Harold Christie. In December 1962, U.S. President John F. Kennedy stayed at E. P. Taylor's home in Lyford Cay while he held talks with British Prime Minister Harold Macmillan.

== Cay ==
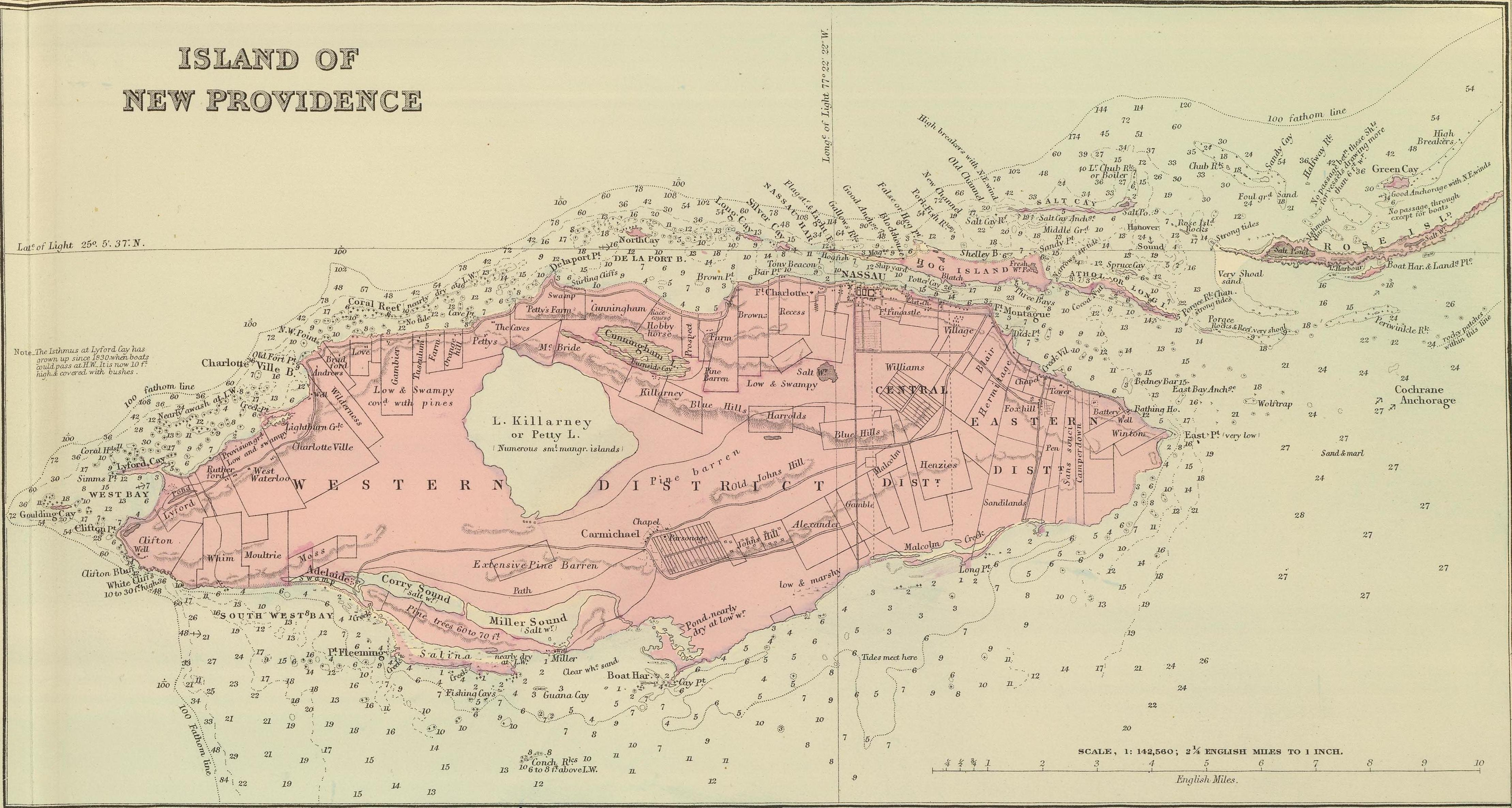
Edward Stanford 1901 atlas page: Bahamas, with New Providence Island inset

Lyford Cay, also called Simms Cay, was a cay a few hundred metres off the north west coast of New Providence Island, 1.4 km long east-west, and up to 200 metres wide. On the map in the 1901 Edward Stanford Atlas it is noted: "The Isthmus at Lyford Cay has grown since 1830, when boats could pass at H.W. It is now 10 ft high & covered with bushes."

== Notable residents ==
- The Bacardi family
- Louis Bacon, U.S. hedge fund manager
- The German-Dutch Brenninkmeijer family
- R. Couri Hay, a Couristan carpet heir and the society editor of Palm Beach magazine and Hamptons magazine
- Viktor Kožený, Czech fugitive financier
- Joe Lewis, British businessman

== Former residents ==
- Sean Connery, Scottish actor, Connery died at Lyford Cay in 2020
- Henry Ford II, son of Edsel Ford, grandson of Henry Ford, former president of the Ford Motor Company
- Stavros Niarchos, Greek shipping magnate
- Peter Nygård, Finnish-Canadian former fashion executive
- Helen Singer Kaplan, Austrian-American-Bahamian sex therapist
- Tony O'Reilly, Irish former media CEO
- Sir John Templeton, American-born British investor and philanthropist
- Arthur Hailey, British-Canadian novelist, author of The Lyford legacy: a history of Lyford Cay from 1788
