= BankPro =

Private digital bank in the Bahamas

BankPro Limited
- Type: Private digital bank
- Industry: Financial services
- Founded: 2018; 8 years ago
- Headquarters: Nassau, The Bahamas
- Website: www.bankpro.com

BankPro Limited is a private digital bank based in Nassau, The Bahamas. Established in 2018, it is regulated by the Central Bank of The Bahamas (CBOB) as a Non-Resident Banking institution. It combines private banking services with investment capabilities.

BankPro operates from its headquarters in Lyford Cay, Nassau.

The bank offers multi-currency accounts that support over 24 currencies. BankPro also offers Visa Platinum cards, global banking services, and investing in more than 2,500 stocks and ETFs listed across major US, EU, and UK exchanges.

In September 2021, a new office building was opened at Lyford Cay to serve as the headquarters of BankPro.

In April 2024, BankPro introduced dual-interface debit cards in the Caribbean in collaboration with Arroweye, a US-based payment card manufacturer. The partnership supports BankPro's in-demand debit card production model, which eliminates the need for pre-printed card inventory and speeds up customer service.

In January 2026, BankPro became a partner with McLaren's United Autosports WEC Hypercar Team. In 2026, BankPro redesigned its flagship mobile application as part of broader updates to its digital platform.
