= William Lyford Jr. =

Captain William Lyford Jr. was born in the year 1719 on the island of New Providence in the Bahamas. He was a Captain of many ships transporting goods between North American colonies and the Caribbean. He was also a privateer and loyalist. The gated community Lyford Cay in Nassau, Bahamas is named after him.
