= 2024 in the Bahamas =

- Decades: 2000s; 2010s; 2020s
- See also: History of the Bahamas; List of years in the Bahamas

This article lists events from the year 2024 in The Bahamas.

== Incumbents ==
- Monarch: Charles III
- Governor-General: Cynthia A. Pratt
- Prime Minister: Philip Davis

== Events ==
- 27 March – Don Saunders, the deputy chair of the Free National Movement, is fatally shot in a robbery in Gambier Village, west of Nassau.
- 4-5 May – 2024 World Athletics Relays at Nassau
- 4 December – Clayton Fernander resigns as commissioner of the Royal Bahamas Police Force amid an investigation by the United States into the force's involvement in drug trafficking.

== Deaths ==
- 13 May - Loftus Roker, Bahamian politician

== Holidays ==
- 1 January - New Year's Day
- 10 January - Majority rule Day
- 29 March – Good Friday
- 1 April - Easter Monday
- 20 May - Whit Monday
- 7 June - Randol Fawkes Day
- 10 July – Independence Day
- 5 August - Emancipation Day
- 14 October - National Heroes' Day
- 25 December – Christmas Day
- 26 December – Boxing Day

== See also ==
- List of years in the Bahamas
- 2024 Atlantic hurricane season
- 2024 in the Caribbean
