= 2003 in the Bahamas =

- Decades: 1980s; 1990s; 2000s; 2010s; 2020s
- See also: History of the Bahamas; List of years in the Bahamas

This article lists events from the year 2003 in The Bahamas.

== Incumbents ==
- Monarch: Elizabeth II
- Governor-General: Dame Ivy Dumont
- Prime Minister: Perry Christie

== Events ==
=== September ===
- September 3 -Tropical Storm Henri hits the Bahamas

== See also ==
List of years in the Bahamas
