= 2019 in the Bahamas =

- Decades: 1990s; 2000s; 2010s; 2020s
- See also: History of the Bahamas; List of years in the Bahamas

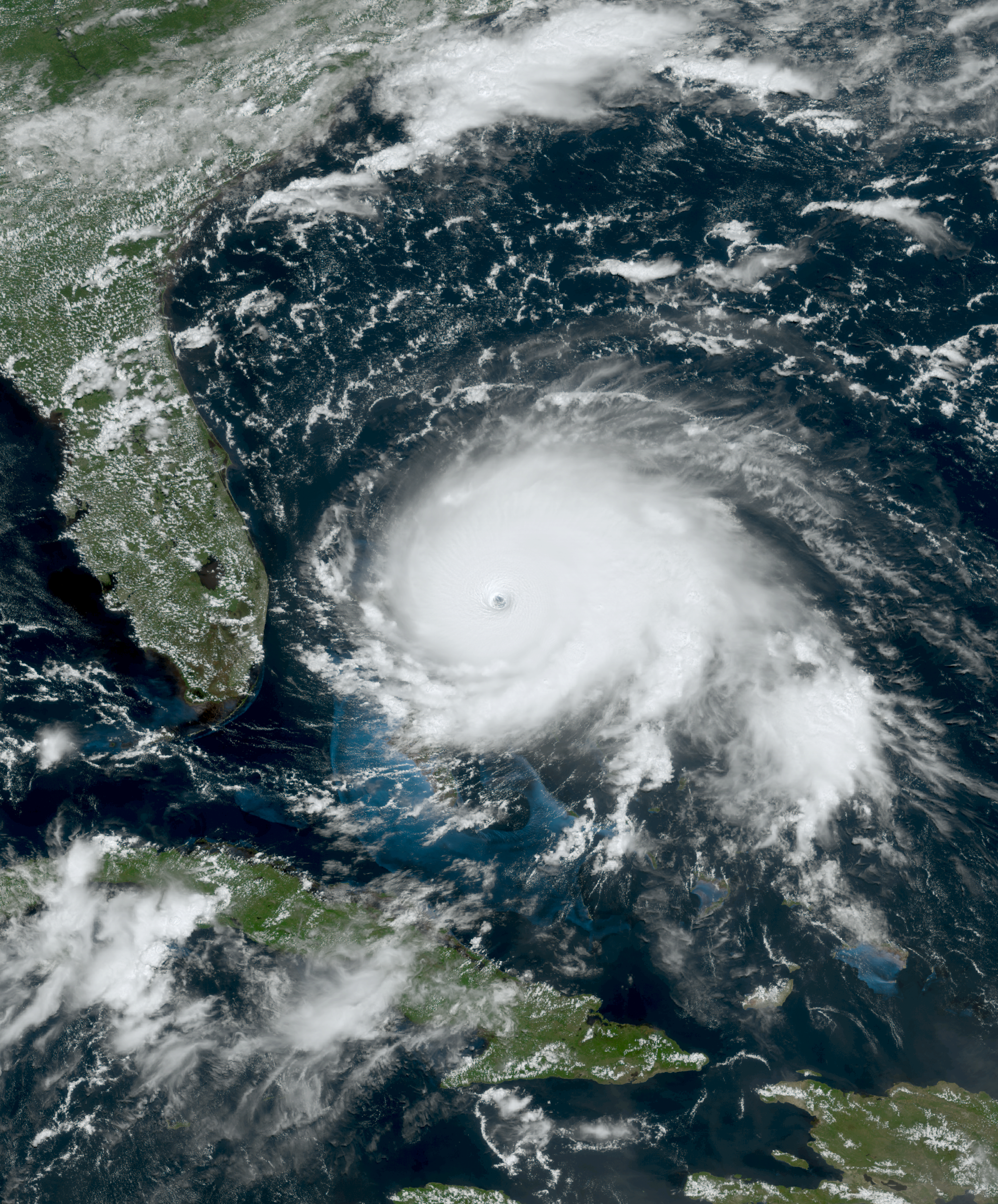
Hurricane Dorian making landfall in the Bahamas at peak intensity on September 1

This article lists events from the year 2019 in the Bahamas

== Incumbents ==
- Monarch: Elizabeth II
- Governor-General: Marguerite Pindling (until June 28), Cornelius A. Smith (from June 28)
- Prime Minister: Hubert Minnis

== Events ==
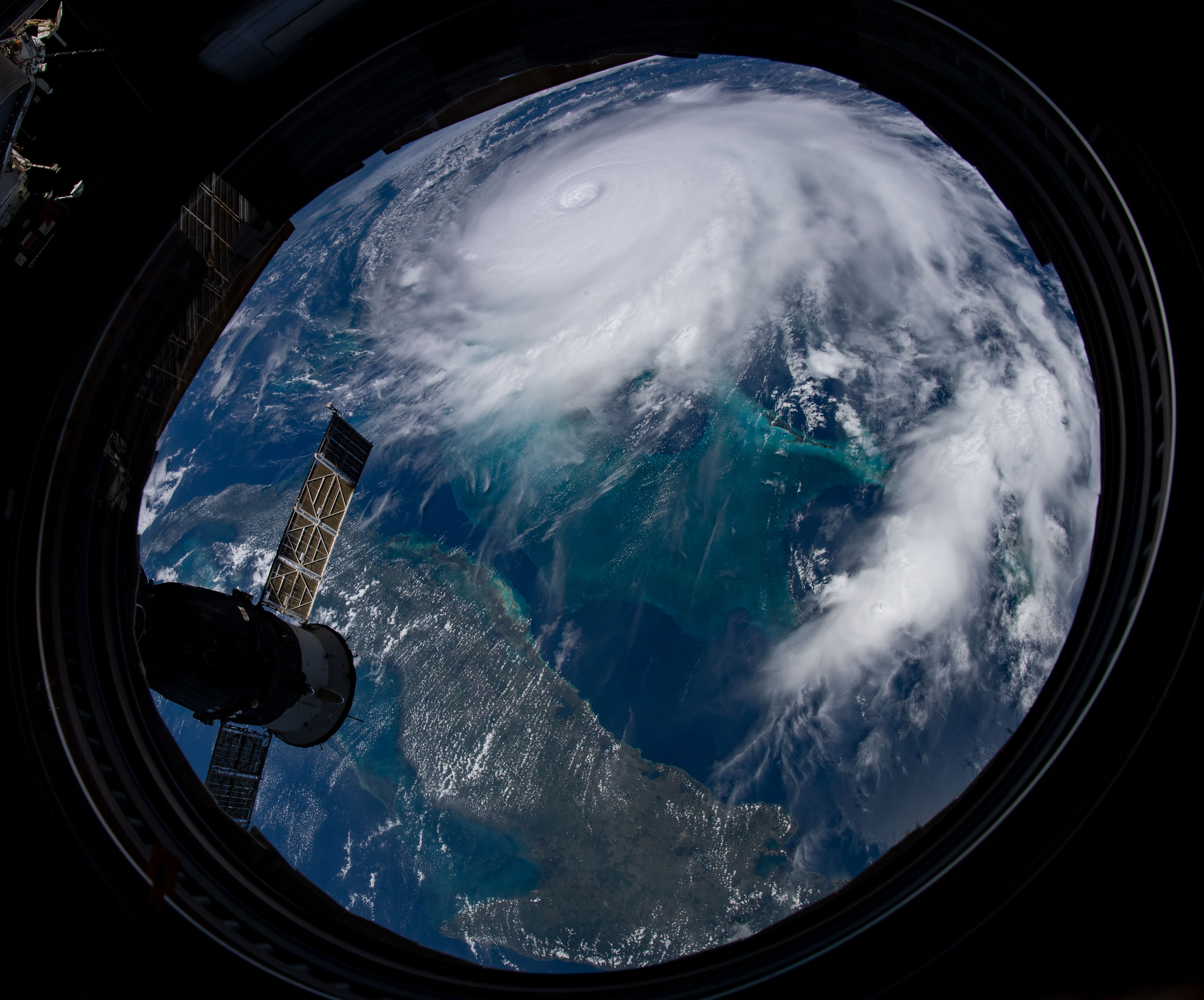
Hurricane Dorian over the Bahamas as seen from the International Space Station on 2 September 2019

- Hurricane Dorian

== Deaths ==
- 21 January – Ervin Knowles, former cabinet minister (b. 1934).

== See also ==
- List of years in the Bahamas
- Effects of Hurricane Dorian in The Bahamas

== Links ==
- Media related to 2019 in the Bahamas at Wikimedia Commons
