= 1999 in the Bahamas =

- Decades: 1970s; 1980s; 1990s; 2000s; 2010s
- See also: History of the Bahamas; List of years in the Bahamas

This article lists events from the year 1999 in The Bahamas.

== Incumbents ==
- Monarch: Elizabeth II
- Governor-General: Sir Orvile Turnquest
- Prime Minister: Hubert Ingraham

== Events ==
- September 14 – Hurricane Floyd hits the Bahamas

== See also ==
List of years in the Bahamas

== Links ==
Media related to 1999 in the Bahamas at Wikimedia Commons
