= 2017 in the Bahamas =

- Decades: 1990s; 2000s; 2010s; 2020s
- See also: History of the Bahamas; List of years in the Bahamas

This article lists events from the year 2017 in The Bahamas.

== Incumbents ==
- Monarch: Elizabeth II
- Governor-General: Dame Marguerite Pindling
- Prime Minister: Perry Christie (until May 10); Hubert Minnis (from May 11)

== Events ==
- May 10 - Bahamian General election is held

== See also ==
List of years in the Bahamas

== Links ==
Media related to 2017 in the Bahamas at Wikimedia Commons
