= John Tinker (Royal Navy officer) =

Royal Navy officer

Captain John Tinker
- Born: John Bladen Tinker; 1725
- Died: 19 July 1767 (aged 41–42)
- Relatives: John Tinker (father)
- Military career
- Allegiance: Kingdom of Great Britain
- Branch: Royal Navy
- Service years: 1741–1767
- Rank: Captain
- Commands: HMS Experiment; HMS Trident; HMS Dover; HMS Argo; HMS Medway; East Indies Station

Captain John Bladen Tinker (c.1725 – 19 July 1767) was a senior Royal Navy officer who served as Commander-in-Chief, East Indies Station from 1763 to 1765.

== Naval career ==
John Bladen Tinker was born in about 1725. He joined the Royal Navy on 15 June 1741 as an ordinary seaman on board the 90-gun ship of the line HMS Bafleur. Promoted to captain on 4 July 1756, he was given command of the sixth-rate HMS Experiment. He went on to command, successively, the third-rate HMS Trident, the fifth-rate HMS Dover and the sixth-rate HMS Argo. His last command was the fourth-rate HMS Medway in which he sailed out to the far east and served as Commander-in-Chief, East Indies Station from 1763 to 1765.
