= Capture of the Bahamas (1782) =

Conflict in 1782

- Part of the American Revolutionary War
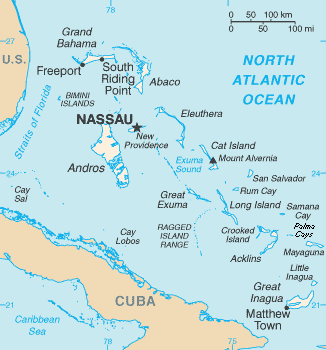
- Map of the Bahamas
Date	May 1782
Location	Nassau, Bahamas 25°03′35.84″N 77°20′42.06″W
Result	Spanish victory

Belligerents
Great Britain	Spain

Commanders and leaders
(Kingdom of Great Britain) John Maxwell	(Spain) Juan Manuel Cagigal y Monserrat (Spain) Francisco de Miranda

Strength
23 ships 1,400+	59 ships 1,500 sailors 1,588 regulars 50 light infantry 202 militia

Casualties and losses
1,412 captured 77 merchant ships captured 1 frigate captured 4 brigantines captured 5 schooners captured 2 sloops captured 11 privateer ships captured	None

The Capture of the Bahamas took place in May 1782 during the American Revolutionary War when a Spanish force under the command of Juan Manuel Cagigal arrived on the island of New Providence near Nassau, the capital of the Bahamas. The British commander at Nassau, John Maxwell decided to surrender the island without a fight when confronted by the superior force.

== Background ==
Spain had entered the American War of Independence in 1779 and launched a campaign to drive the British out of the Gulf of Mexico, overrunning the British colony of West Florida, and seizing its major outposts at Mobile and Pensacola. The Spanish commander Bernardo de Gálvez planned an attack against Nassau, the capital of the Bahamas which served as a major British privateering base. Gálvez authorised an expedition against the islands in late 1781, but this was postponed during the Yorktown Campaign, which led to the surrender of a British army in October 1781. In early 1782 the scheme was revived and command of it was given to Juan Cagigal, the Governor of Havana.

== Capture ==
In spite of receiving orders from Gálvez to abandon the previously planned expedition so his forces could be used for an invasion of Jamaica, Cagigal pressed ahead with his scheme and sailed from Havana on 18 April 1782. He had 2,500 troops, leaving the garrison of Havana very low, and unable to send troops to support Gálvez's Jamaican expedition. He had managed to secure additional ships and transports from the South Carolina Navy led by Alexander Gillon.

On 6 May Cagigal's ships came into view of Nassau. He convinced the British commander, Vice Admiral John Maxwell, to surrender without opening a formal siege of the town. Maxwell offered twelve articles of surrender, a list which was mildly revised by Cagigal before he accepted the surrender. Spanish forces then occupied the town, taking the 600-strong British garrison as prisoners and capturing several ships, including a frigate.

== Aftermath ==
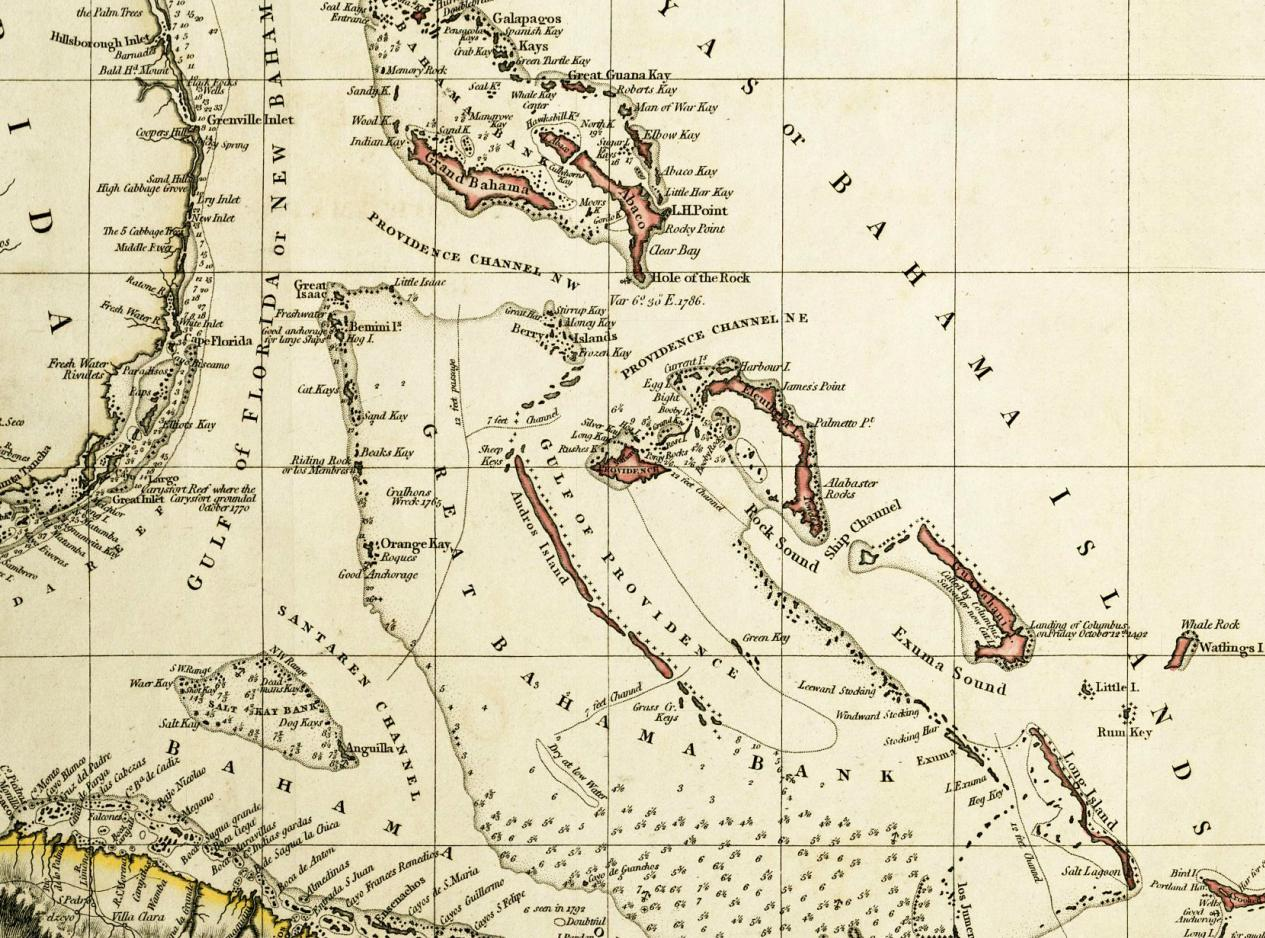
An 1803 map showing New Providence and Nassau

Gálvez was angered that Cagigal had not followed his orders to abandon the attack, and was also frustrated because the British naval victory at the Battle of the Saintes had forced him to abandon the planned Franco-Spanish invasion of Jamaica. Gálvez arranged to have Cagigal arrested for his alleged mistreatment of a British general, John Campbell, following the Siege of Pensacola in 1781. Cagigal was imprisoned in Cádiz and his military career was thus ruined. One of his associates, Francisco de Miranda, was also charged with a similar offence, which may have motivated his later career as an advocate of independence for Spain's American colonies. Miranda later explained Gálvez's actions as stemming from jealousy of Cagigal's success. Ultimately, it was Gálvez who was to receive credit for the capture of the Bahamas despite the fact he had tried to cancel the project. An American Loyalist named Andrew Deveaux set forth to recapture Nassau, which he achieved on 17 April 1783, with only 220 men and 150 muskets to face a force of 600 trained soldiers. By this time, however, the Spanish crown had already recognized British sovereignty over the Bahamas in exchange for East Florida under the Treaty of Paris.

== Bibliography ==
- Beerman, E. La última batalla de la guerra de la independencia no fue Yorktown. La expedición hispano-norteamericana a las Bahamas 1782, Revista de Historia Naval, nº5 de 1984. (in Spanish)
- Chavez, Thomas E. Spain and the Independence of the United States: An Intrinsic Gift, University of New Mexico Press, 2003.
- Marley, David. Wars of the Americas: A Chronology of Armed Conflict in the New World, 1492 to the Present, ABC-CLIO (1998). ISBN 0-87436-837-5
