= Fort Montagu =

18th century fortification located in Nassau, Bahamas

Coordinates: 25.0736°N 77.3066°W

- Part of Nassau, Bahamas
- Nassau, The Bahamas
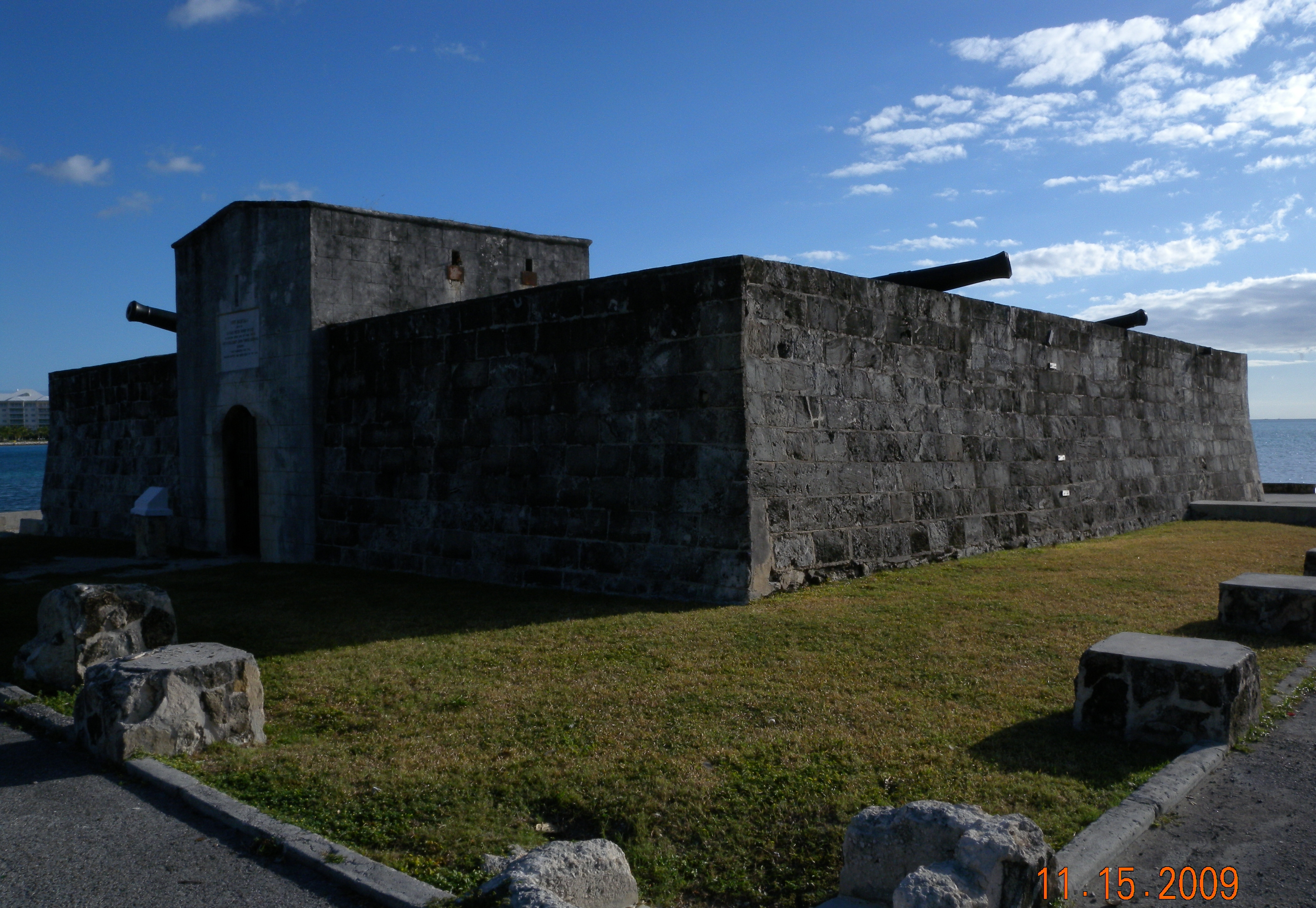
- Fort Montagu, Nassau, The Bahamas

Site information
- Type: Defensive Fortification
- Open to the public: Year Round
- Condition: Historic site

Site history
- Built: 1741–1742
- Built by: Peter Henry Bruce
- In use: 1740s–??
- Materials: Limestone
- Battles/wars: Battle of Nassau
- Events: Capture of the Bahamas (1783)

Fort Montagu is a small fort of four cannon located on the eastern shore of New Providence Island (Nassau) Bahamas. Peter Henry Bruce oversaw the construction of the fort that began in 1741 to defend the British possession from Spanish invaders.

== Construction ==
After Governor John Tinker arrived in 1741, he saw that there was only one fort on the island (Fort Nassau). He knew that one fort wasn't enough defense and had military engineer Peter Henry Bruce construct another one at the eastern end of the island. Construction for the fort began in 1741 and finished in 1742. The fort is made out of limestone and when it was built, it had 23 cannons and over 95 barrels of gun powder.

== Raid on Nassau ==
The fort played an important role during the American Revolutionary War, as it was the United States Marine Corps' first successful Amphibious assault by Esek Hopkins during the Battle of Nassau.

The fort had not seen action for over 30 years. After a stealth approach failed to reach New Providence from the north (due to the sound of a cannon being fired), Hopkins approached New Providence from the east side of the harbor. However, he first had to deal with Fort Montague. The fort was ordered by Governor Montfort Browne to fire three warning shots. However, the soldiers evacuated the fort and went home or to Fort Nassau. The Americans seized the fort and Fort Nassau eventually surrendered.

== Spanish control ==
In 1782 a fleet of over 80 Spanish ships approached Fort Nassau. The fort promptly surrendered to the Spanish.

== Recaptured for the British ==
In 1783, Colonel Andrew Deveaux, a Loyalist in St. Augustine, Florida, heard that the nearby British territory of The Bahamas had been captured by Spain. Deveaux set out that same year with the goal to recapture it for Britain. Using 220 militia and 150 muskets, he devised a plan to trick the Spanish troops inside. He had his men row from the ship in sight of the Spanish and once they were out of sight, he would tell them to duck down and row back, making it appear as if he had more men than he actually did. This was repeated over and over. Thought to be outnumbered and scared, the Spanish attempted to burn down the fort. However, this was prevented by Andrew Deveaux, who then went on to capture Fort Nassau.
