= Harold Christie =

Bahamian business man and politician

- Born: May 30, 1896; Nassau, Bahamas
- Died: September 25, 1973 (aged 77); Frankfurt, Germany
- Occupation: Real Estate
- Years active: 1922-1973

Sir Harold George Christie, CBE (30 May 1896 – 25 September 1973), known as H.G., was a Bahamian politician, realtor, developer and businessman. Christie is known as "The Father of Bahamas Real Estate".

== Early life and real estate business ==
Christie was born into poverty as the eldest of four children and a descendant of Loyalist Adam Christie. Christie was enlisted in the Royal Flying Corps in Canada during World War I. In 1922, he returned to the Bahamas to establish H.G. Christie Real Estate which began as a modest office, his brother Frank Homes Christie, CBE joined him in growing the company.

H.G Christie Real Estate was the first real estate company to capitalise on the luxury market in the Bahamas and had a hand in almost all real estate developments in the country during his career, most notably Windermere Island in Eleuthera and Lyford Cay in New Providence. Christie is also attracted well known investors to the Bahamas including Guy Baxter, Arthur Vining Davis, Wallace Groves, E. P. Taylor, Lord Beaverbrook and many others.

== Political career ==
In 1927, Christie was elected as a representative for the Abaco District and in 1935 he became the representative for Cat Island; he served this district until he retired from politics in 1966.

== Friendship with Harry Oakes ==
One person Christie invited to the Bahamas was Harry Oakes, an American millionaire who made his fortune in gold mining in Canada. The pair would become close business associates and friends.

Oakes invested in Bahamas Airways Limited and encouraged Collar to expand his fleet. In January 1949, British South American Airways, in which Christie had a stake, bought Bahamas Airways. Bahamas Airways was the first commercial airline in the Bahamas and would help to grow the tourism and real estate sector. Its flight cut what was once a five-day journey by vessel to the Bahamas to just a ninety-minute flight.

On the night Oakes died, Christie had been staying at his house and testified that he heard nothing during the night. He was questioned at length during the trial.

== Personal life ==
In 1959, Christie was married for the first time at age 63 to Virginia Campbell Johnson. They had no biological children; Lady Christie had a son from a previous relationship.

== Death ==
Christie died on September 25, 1973, in Frankfurt, Germany, while on a business trip.

== Legacy ==
Christie was honoured with a CBE in 1949 and a knighthood in 1964. Currently, H.G Christie Real Estate is the oldest and largest real estate company in The Bahamas.
