= HMS Medway (1755) =

60-gun fourth rate ship of the line of the Royal Navy

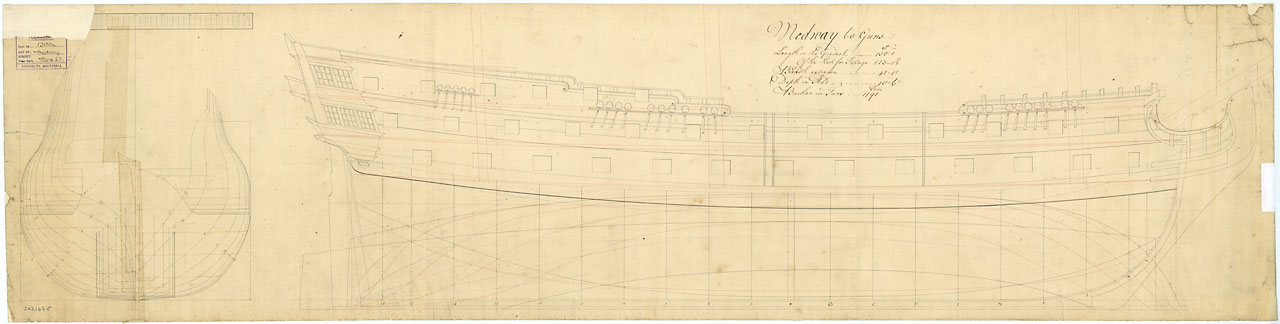
- Medway

History

Great Britain
- Name: HMS Medway
- Ordered: 24 April 1751
- Builder: Deptford Dockyard
- Launched: 14 February 1755
- Fate: Broken up, 1811

General characteristics
- Class & type: 1745 Establishment 60-gun fourth rate ship of the line
- Tons burthen: 1204
- Length: 150 ft (45.7 m) (gundeck)
- Beam: 42 ft 8 in (13.0 m)
- Depth of hold: 18 ft 6 in (5.6 m)
- Propulsion: Sails
- Sail plan: Full-rigged ship
- Armament: 60 guns: Gundeck: 24 × 24 pdrs; Upper gundeck: 26 × 18 pdrs; Quarterdeck: 8 × 6 pdrs; Forecastle: 2 × 6 pdrs

HMS Medway was a 60-gun fourth rate ship of the line of the Royal Navy, built at Deptford Dockyard to the draught specified by the 1745 Establishment, and launched on 14 February 1755. The launch was painted at least twice by John Cleveley the Elder.

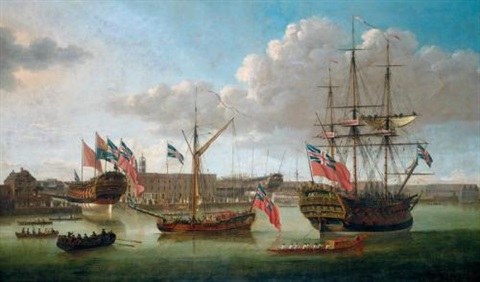
Deptford Dockyard, showing the launch of the Medway in 1755, by John Cleveley the Elder

In 1787 Medway was converted to serve as a receiving ship, and remained in this role until 1811, when she was broken up.
