= John Tinker (colonial administrator) =

18th-century Danish general

- Governor of the Bahama Islands
- Reign: 1741 – 1758
- Born: 30 July 1700; Westminster, England
- Died: 10 July 1758 (aged 57–58); Nassau, Bahamas
- Buried: Nassau, Bahamas
- Occupation: Governor of the Bahamas

John Tinker (1700–1758) was an early Colonial official who served the Royal African Company on the Gold Coast, was an Agent for the South Sea Company in Portobello, and was Royal Governor of the Bahama Islands from 1741 to 1758.

== Early life ==
John Tinker was born and baptised on 30 July 1700 to parents Jeremiah and Hannah at St Martin-in-the-Fields, Westminster. His grandfather was Captain John Tinker, Master Attendant of the King's Yard at Deptford who commanded the Coverdine during the reign of Charles II.

== Career ==
In 1722 John served as governor of the Cape Coast Castle (in what was then called Guinea), a trading post of the Royal African Company which traded principally in gold and slaves. In 1724 he was joined on the Gold Coast by his brother Jeremiah who was based close by at Whydah and also by Nathaniel Rice (later to be a relative). He remained there until 1726, when both Tinker and Rice returned to England.

=== Panama ===
By 1730, Tinker had been appointed Chief of the Panama Factory at Portobello for the South Sea Company, where he was responsible for organising the import of slaves under the Asiento de Negros agreement reached at the 1713 Treaty of Utrecht. He was in post throughout the 1730s, although it seems unlikely his family joined him in Panama as his sons were at school in England and his wife Isabella was residing in London.

In 1738 it was announced that he was to be the next Governor of the Bahamas so it is likely he had left Portobello before Admiral Vernon captured it, but he was still involved in its affairs, as in 1739, when the Board of Trade was considering ways to prevent the Spanish from exporting from their silver mines in Peru and Mexico, both Tinker and his father-in-law Martin Bladen suggested locating a military base at Darien on the Isthmus of Panama. Vernon rejected this idea as the location was too isolated and would need to be garrisoned.

=== Bahamas ===
Tinker did not arrive in post until April 1741 and his first priority was strengthening the island's military defences by building Fort Montagu at the entrance to Nassau Harbour, which was accomplished within the first year, and also a small battery nearby which he called Bladen's Battery (named for his son). When funds for fortifications ran low and Bahamians were taxed to raise money, he had difficulties with his Assembly. They were unhappy with the new taxation and stopped his salary and so he dissolved the Assembly.

Despite these difficulties and war with Spain and France, privateers in Nassau seized enemy ships and the whole economy shared in prize money from the vessels. In fact, so many Bahamians were involved in privateering that traditional industries like agriculture were neglected. Tinker had found it difficult to eradicate privateering or entice new settlers as the cost of living was high and the currency was in a poor state. Most of the difficulties he encountered he tended to blame on the people he governed, rather than his own ability to govern.

== Freemasons ==
Tinker had joined the Freemasons in London in 1730 and, in 1755, he made the long journey from New Providence to Philadelphia to attend the greatest procession of Masons ever seen in America at the inauguration of a new Lodge. Tinker, along with Benjamin Franklin and son William Franklin were at the head of a procession of 160 Masons in full regalia through the streets led by a sword bearer and which was accompanied by peals of bells and the firing of cannons from a nearby ship.

== Personal life ==
On 6 February 1727/28 he married Isabella Bladen, the daughter of Martin Bladen a senior commissioner at the Board of Trade and he received a generous marriage settlement. They had two sons, Captain John Bladen Tinker (1728–1767) and Jeremiah Tinker (1730–1795).

John Tinker later lived in the Bahamas separately from wife Isabella, who remained in London, and he had a second family in the Bahamas with Sophia Trigge (who later became the wife of Tinker's secretary John Snow).

John Tinker died in the Bahamas on 10 July 1758.

Government offices
Preceded by Richard Fitzwilliam (acting)	Governor of the Bahamas; 1741–1758	Succeeded by John Gambier (acting)
