= George Myers (hotelier) =

Bahamian hotelier and businessman

George Myers (c. 1939 – 17 February 2023) was a Bahamian hotelier and businessman. He was credited with playing a major part in the development of Paradise Island into a premier tourist destination in the Bahamas.

== Early life ==
Myers was born in Jamaica, where his family was in the hotel business. As a child, he worked in family-owned Miranda Lodge in Montego Bay.

== Career ==
Myers worked in London as a management trainee at the Westbury Hotel before moving to the Bahamas in 1963. He started out as a bar manager before working his way up to hotel vice-president. Myers was executive vice president of Resorts International from 1977 to 1992. The group operated numerous hotels and resorts in the Bahamas which Myers oversaw.

In 1992, Myers founded the Myers Group and served as its chair and CEO. The Myers Group owns the Bahamian franchises for Burger King, Dunkin' Donuts, Kentucky Fried Chicken (KFC), and Quiznos Subs. The group previously operated the Radisson Cable Beach Hotel.

In 1970, he was chair of the Nassau and Paradise Island Visitors and Groups Promotion Board. Myers also served as chair of the Paradise Island Tourism Board. Myers was president of the Bahamas Hotel Employers Association, the Bahamas Hotel Association, and the Caribbean Hotel Association.

== Awards ==
In 1980, Myers was named the Caribbean Hotel Association's Hotelier of the Year. In 1998, he was given the government's Silver Jubilee Award in recognition of "outstanding contribution to national development, in particular, in tourism". In 2006, Myers was awarded the Sir Clement Maynard Lifetime Achievement Award at the Cacique Awards. In 2009, he was awarded the Bahamas Chamber of Commerce's Achievement Award.

In 2022, Myers was awarded the Order of Merit, the country's highest honour.

== Death ==
Myers died on 17 February 2023, at the age of 83. He was survived by his wife and step-daughter.
