= Capture of the Bahamas (1783) =

British victory in the American Revolutionary War

- Part of the American Revolutionary War
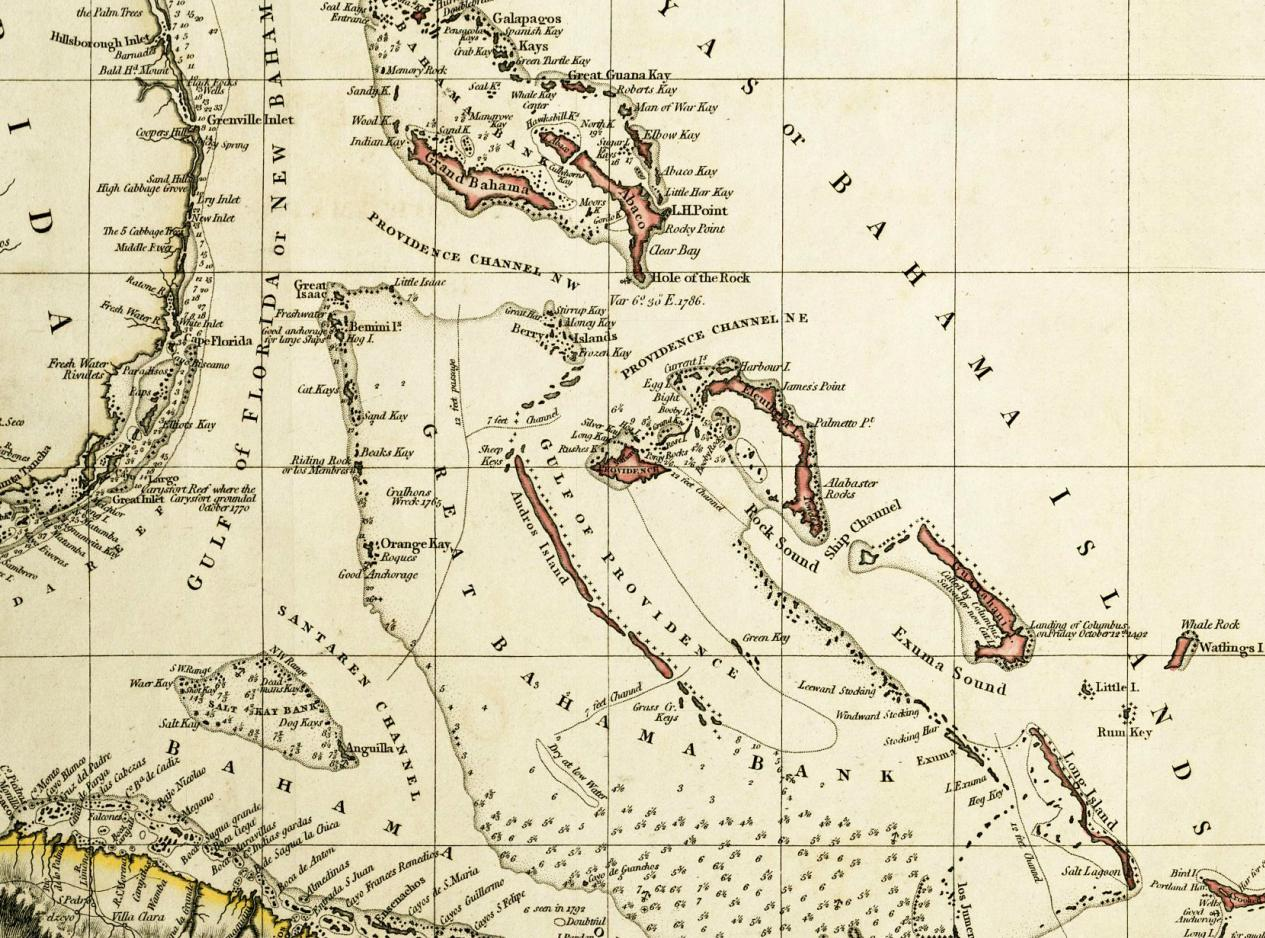
- Map of New Providence and Nassau
| Date | 6–18 April 1783 |
| Location | Nassau, Bahamas 25°04′N 77°20′W |
| Result | British victory |

Belligerents
| Great Britain | Spain |

Commanders and leaders
| (Kingdom of Great Britain) Andrew Deveaux | (Spain) Don Antonio Claraco Sauz (surrendered) |

Strength
| 227 regulars, militia & volunteers 7 ships | 600-700 regulars, sailors & marines 7 ships 50 guns |

Casualties and losses
| None | 600-700 captured 50 cannons captured 7 ships captured |

The Capture of the Bahamas was a British Loyalist expedition in April 1783, in the closing weeks of the American Revolutionary War, to recover the Bahamas from the Spanish, who had seized the islands the previous May. Led by Andrew Deveaux, a South Carolina Loyalist, it was a private venture financed by Deveaux and manned largely by recruits from the out islands of the Bahamas.

Landing at New Providence on 14 April, the force took Fort Montagu and three Spanish vessels; batteries were established on the ridge above Nassau, and Deveaux bluffed the garrison with dummy troops and the threat of Native American allies. The Spanish governor, Don Antonio Claraco y Sanz, capitulated on 18 April. It was one of the last actions of the entire war.

== Background ==
The Bahamas had been taken by Spanish forces from the British in May 1782. The situation changed however firstly with Royal Navy dominant in the Caribbean following the Battle of the Saintes the same year, and secondly with the preliminary articles of peace agreed on 20 January 1783. Under them, Spain consented to restore the Bahamas to Britain in exchange for East Florida. Although the agreement established the intended transfer of sovereignty, the formal peace settlement had not yet been completed, and Spanish troops continued to occupy Nassau.

St Augustine in East Florida, on the other hand, was still in British hands, the Spanish thinking it too well defended to attack. Andrew Deveaux had settled at St Augustine with other Loyalists who had left Charleston in December 1782 after the British evacuation. Deveaux planned to retake the Bahamas by launching an attack on Nassau.

The governor of East Florida, Patrick Tonyn, authorised the attack, though no regular troops were assigned. Deveaux began recruiting volunteers in St Augustine in early 1783. The expedition was organised around the group of Loyalist refugees, with provisions made for the distribution of land and other rewards following the successful capture of the islands. They were also promised an equal share of prizes, with passage elsewhere for those who did not stay.

== Expedition ==
Deveaux and his second in command, Major Archibald Taylor, sailed from St Augustine on 1 April with between forty and seventy men. Among them were a small number of Cherokee, Choctaw and Seminole natives led by Colonel David Fanning. Six small vessels carried them, two of them private ships of war: the 26-gun brigantine Perseverance of Captain Thomas Dowe, and the 16-gun, 120-man brigantine Whitby Warrior of Daniel Wheeler.

=== Harbour Island ===
Anchoring off Harbour Island on 6 April, the force spread out in small boats to recruit in the out islands. They enlisted 170 to 300 men and dozens of boats under local militia officers, and had guards posted so that no one could warn the Spanish garrison on New Providence. At least fifty of the newly enlisted men, the majority of them free blacks, had no muskets and carried only pikes. What is more, the expedition had brought no artillery.

On 10 April the Spanish sloop Flor de Mayo brought Claraco a message from the governor of Cuba, Luis de Unzaga, saying that peace preliminaries had been signed back in Europe. It mentioned that the Bahamas were to be restored to British rule in exchange for East Florida. Deveaux, on the other hand, knew nothing of this.

Claraco commanded 600 soldiers and 100 sailors, and held the two important forts: Montagu and Nassau, the latter of which mounted twenty-one cannon and two flanking batteries of three guns. There was a ridge behind the town, and Society Hill in particular offered dominating ground to any force that could land to the east. Despite this, a number of Claraco's men were sick and, especially after hearing news of the preliminaries, demoralised.

=== Capture of Fort Montagu ===
The flotilla arrived on 13 April and was taken for smugglers, so the Spanish took little notice. The Loyalists landed at dawn the next day about a mile from Fort Montagu. The Spanish sighted the advancing column, sallied from the fort and formed a line in the open field. Deveaux's men charged, surprising the Spanish, who managed to fire a single volley and then retreated in disorder through the town, away from the fort, which now lay abandoned. Two Spanish prisoners were taken, while Deveaux's men suffered no losses. They had not even fired a shot. Deveaux nevertheless suspected a trap and sent in the two prisoners, who found a lit match and two mines laid to blow the magazine; these were made secure. Meanwhile, seventy men under Captains Dow and Wheeler were sent to the harbour, where they boarded and took three Spanish galleys moored there. This not only gave Deveaux a small naval force but also guns that could be used against the Spanish.

Fort Montagu now gave Deveaux a defensible base, a magazine and a line of retreat to his boats. It also forced Claraco to treat the Loyalists as troops holding part of the defences, and he now realised he lacked the power to drive them back into the sea.

=== Siege of Fort Nassau ===
As Deveaux and his men approached Fort Nassau, Claraco sent out a flag of truce, carrying news of the peace preliminaries and the cession agreement. Deveaux answered with a demand for surrender within fifteen minutes. Claraco instead asked for a private conference, from which a truce of several days emerged. Deveaux soon rescinded the truce, arguing that Claraco was not observing it and was simply stalling for time. The Loyalists made ready to renew hostilities.

Despite being outnumbered and outgunned, Deveaux resorted to a ruse. He ordered his men to make effigies of straw and dot them around Fort Montagu, to convince the Spanish that he had more men than he did. In addition he made a show of boats unloading troops at the shore before rowing back for more. It was in fact the same batch of men being ferried back and forth, crouching out of sight on the return and sitting up to be counted on the approach. The other ruse was the use of the Native Americans: troops were painted and disguised to resemble them, and two of the Choctaws were presented as chiefs "commanding several hundred warriors who would be loosed on the town if it were stormed".

On 16 April the Loyalists hauled cannon from the captured vessels onto Society Hill, the highest point on the ridge, which was four hundred yards from Fort Nassau. Another crew under Captain Mackenzie took possession of an adjacent hill three hundred yards farther off. British flags were raised over both batteries. The Spanish fired steadily but to no effect, and made no sortie in strength to drive the working parties off. During the evening Claraco ordered the remaining ships to be scuttled, fearing they would be captured in a night attack. The Spanish then huddled within the main fort as the British began to construct a third battery.

=== Surrender ===
On 18 April, with two batteries ready, Deveaux again summoned the fort, warning that an assault would cost the garrison dear. A well-directed round shot was fired at the governor's house, forcing Claraco into a conference with his officers; he agreed to surrender at once.

The articles of capitulation were signed the same day. Deveaux's terms were generous. The Spanish garrison marched out to Fort Montagu with the honours of war and was allowed to fly the Spanish flag. The prisoners were fed at British expense and shipping was found to carry the troops to Havana.

== Aftermath ==
Around 600-700 Spaniards surrendered, and 50 cannon and seven ships were captured. Some of the ships that had been scuttled were later refloated, and the Spaniards were repatriated to Cuba. Claraco was held as a hostage for a few weeks after the surrender, until the exchange of prisoners had been effected. One of those exchanged was the former governor, John Maxwell. The recapture was well received: Brigadier General Archibald McArthur called it "a very splendid action lately performed by Major Deveaux of the Beaufort militia", and the commissioners on Loyalist claims awarded Deveaux £100 a year for "an act of Spirit which we admire and which we think ought not to go unrewarded".

The surrender caused a sensation in the Spanish Caribbean. The Spanish government protested to the British that the descent on the Bahamas had been unnecessary. On his return to Havana, Claraco was heavily criticised for surrendering to a force a fraction of his own. His defence was that the colony had been indefensible once the ridge was taken by the British. This was not enough however and he was arrested, tried by court martial and imprisoned, and was only acquitted on review in 1791. He never held another governorship.

The Treaty of Paris of 3 September 1783 formally restored the islands in exchange for East Florida, and because British subjects already held them, no handover was needed. The participants were the first Loyalists granted Bahamian land, Deveaux receiving 250 acres on New Providence and 1,000 on Cat Island, where he built a mansion, Deveaux House, at Port Howe; the remains can be seen today.

Thousands of white Loyalists and enslaved Africans followed from East Florida, Georgia and the Carolinas, taking up grants on Eleuthera, Exuma, Cat Island and Long Island and clearing land for cotton.

== Bibliography ==
- Craton, Michael; Saunders, Gail (1999). Islanders in the Stream: A History of the Bahamian People. Vol. 1: From Aboriginal Times to the End of Slavery. Athens: University of Georgia Press. ISBN 978-0820321332.
- Crary, Catherine S (1973). The Price of Loyalty: Tory Writings from the Revolutionary Era. New York: McGraw-Hill. ISBN 9780070134607.
- Hairr, John (2023). Carolina Loyalist: The Revolutionary War Life of Colonel David Fanning. McFarland. ISBN 978-1-4766-8867-1.
- Lewis, James A (1991). The Final Campaign of the American Revolution: Rise and Fall of the Spanish Bahamas. Studies in Maritime History. Columbia: University of South Carolina Press. ISBN 978-0872497269.
- Marley, David F (1998). Wars of the Americas: A Chronology of Armed Conflict in the New World, 1492 to the Present. Denver: ABC-CLIO. ISBN 978-0874368376.
