= COVID-19 pandemic in the Bahamas =

Aspect of viral disease pandemic

COVID-19 pandemic in The Bahamas
- Disease: COVID-19
- Pathogen: SARS-CoV-2
- Location: The Bahamas
- First outbreak: Wuhan, Hubei, China
- Index case: New Providence
- Arrival date: 15 March 2020 (6 years, 3 months and 3 days)
- Confirmed cases: 39,127
- Deaths: 849
- Fatality rate: 2.17%

Government website
- Government of The Bahamas - Ministry of Health; Government of The Bahamas- COVID-19 page

The COVID-19 pandemic in the Bahamas was a part of the COVID-19 pandemic of coronavirus disease 2019 (COVID-19). The outbreak was identified in Wuhan, Hubei, China, in December 2019, declared to be a Public Health Emergency of International Concern on 30 January 2020, and recognised as a pandemic by the World Health Organization on 11 March 2020. It was confirmed to have reached the Bahamas on 15 March 2020 with the announcement of the first case.

COVID-19 is an infectious disease caused by severe acute respiratory syndrome coronavirus 2 (SARS-CoV-2). The case fatality rate for COVID-19 has been much lower than for other coronavirus respiratory infections such as SARS and MERS, but the transmission has been significantly greater, with a significant total death toll.

== Timeline ==
Cases

Deaths

=== March 2020 ===
On March 15, Acting Minister of Health Jeffrey Lloyd announced the first confirmed case, a 61-year-old female.

On March 20, Prime Minister Hubert Minnis announced a 9pm to 5am curfew, restrictions on private gatherings, and closure of most in-person businesses, with limited hours for food stores and farmers' markets, pharmacies, gas stations, laundromats, banks, construction, and restaurants (limited to take-out only). Essential workers for the government, utilities, and media were exempted, as were health care providers and suppliers. The airport remained open, but only essential travel was allowed on public buses.

=== April 2020 ===
On 5 April, the Queen of the Bahamas addressed the Commonwealth in a televised broadcast, in which she asked people to "take comfort that while we may have more still to endure, better days will return". She added, "we will be with our friends again; we will be with our families again; we will meet again".

On April 19, the prime minister announced that wearing a mask or covering one's face with clothing is mandatory in public. Employers must provide their employees who are serving the general public with masks.

=== May 2020 ===
On May 21, authorities are maintaining various restrictions across the islands in order to slow the spread of COVID-19. A daily 24-hour curfew on weekdays and weekend lockdowns are from 2100 on Fridays to 0500 on Mondays. The island of Bimini is under complete lockdown at least through May 30. Under the 24 hour curfew, the residents can only leave their homes for essential purposes or for an emergency.

== Cases by islands ==
Islands	Cases	Deaths	References
Abaco	659		
Acklins	28		
Andros	293		
Berry Islands	111		
Bimini & Cat Cay	238		
Cat Island	99		
Crooked Island	33		
Eleuthera	711		
Exuma	366		
Grand Bahama	2,632		
Inagua	61		
Long Island	114		
Mayaguana	21		
New Providence			
San Salvador	16		
Locations Pending			
Totals	23,380		
Last update 22 December, 2021

== Statistics ==
=== New cases and deaths per day ===
View source data.
View source data.

=== Active cases per day ===
Chronology of the number of active cases in the Bahamas

View source data.

== See also ==
- Caribbean Public Health Agency
- COVID-19 pandemic in North America
- COVID-19 pandemic by country and territory
