= Andrew Deveaux =

American Loyalist from South Carolina

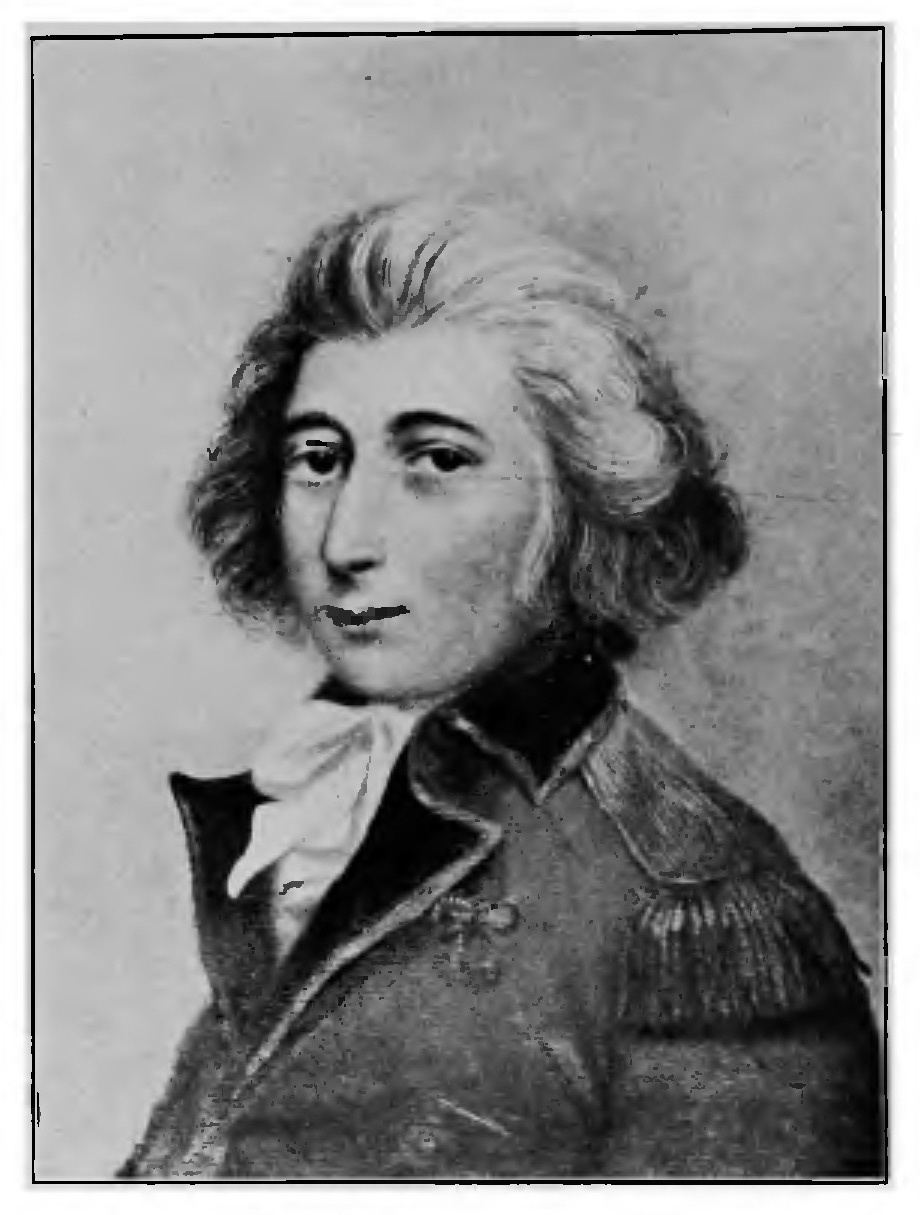
- Born: 30 April 1758; St Helena's Parish, South Carolina
- Died: 11 July 1812 (aged 54); Red Hook, New York
- Military career
- Allegiance: United Kingdom of Great Britain and Ireland
- Branch: Loyalist
- Rank: Colonel
- Commands: South Carolina Loyalist Militia
- Conflicts: American War of Independence; Siege of Savannah (1779); Siege of Charleston (1780); Capture of the Bahamas (1783)

Andrew Deveaux (30 April 1758 – 11 July 1812) was an American Loyalist from South Carolina who is most famous for his recapture of the Bahamas in 1783.

== Early life ==
He was born to plantation owners Andrew Deveaux Senior and Catherine Barnwell on 30 April 1758 at St Helena's Parish in Beaufort, South Carolina. Deveaux's ancestry stretches back to France in 1665 when André de Veaux (who was born in 1665 at Château de Veaux, France) went to the American Colonies in late 17th or early 18th century. Andrew Deveaux Junior was owner of many thousands of acres around Prince William Parish, South Carolina and Port Royal Island.

== Service ==
At the age of 17 Andrew Deveaux Jr., enlisted in the Continental Army. However, the elder Deveaux was under constant badgering by Beaufort locals for his support of the British. In defense of his father, young Deveaux banded together a group of Loyalists who created havoc in and around Beaufort. He and his Loyalist partisans are believed to have been responsible for burning the Prince William Parish church at Sheldon in April 1779. Deveaux joined the services of the British under Major General Augustine Prevost in 1779 and was present at the Siege of Savannah where the Franco-American assault was repulsed with heavy loss. He was also at the Siege of Charleston, after which he was given a commission by Lord Cornwallis to raise a regiment called the "Royal Foresters". Deveaux was promoted to colonel and was given command of a group Loyalist irregulars which captured two American generals in woodland ambushes.

In 1782 he was among the British occupation garrison in Charleston. In December of that year, the British evacuated South Carolina and Deveaux with his men went to St. Augustine, Florida capital of East Florida. He set about a plan to recapture The Bahamas for himself and the British Crown. Nassau had fallen to the Spanish earlier in the year.

== Recapture of the Bahamas ==
From St Augustine Deveaux set off with 70 men and 6 vessels. He was joined by another 170 men whilst on Harbour Island, Bahamas and thus with only 220 men and 150 muskets faced a force of 600 Spanish soldiers. Deveaux forced the Spanish under Don Antonio Claraco Sauz to surrender on April 17, 1783, without a single shot fired. When Deveaux took down the Spanish flag, it marked the last time that a foreign banner was to fly over the Bahamian capital.

== Later life ==
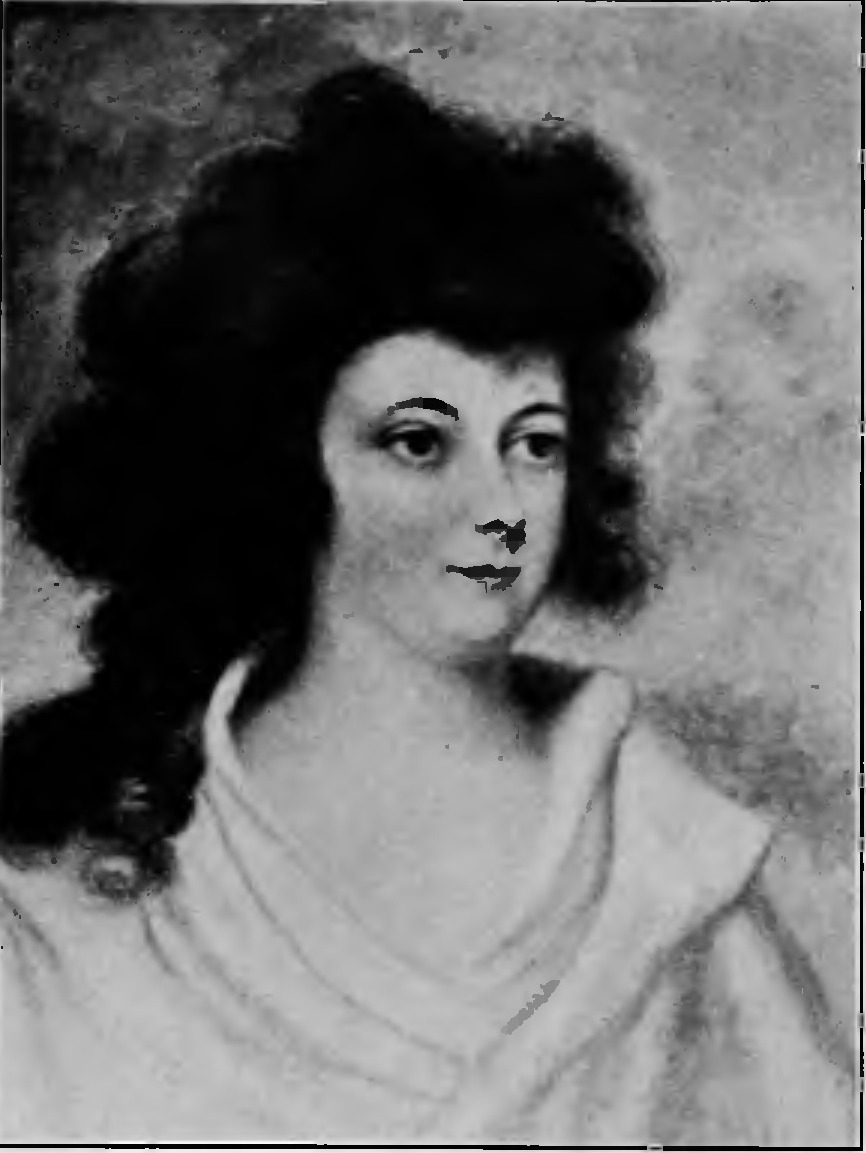
Anna Maria Verplanck

As a reward for his efforts in the Bahamas, Deveaux was given a large portion of Cat Island where he built a mansion at Port Howe, Cat Island, the remains of which can be seen today. He left for England in September 1783 and he often returned to the islands. His fortune however was made in Red Hook, New York where he resided for the remainder of his life. He married Anna Maria Verplanck and they had four children; Steven, William, Augusta Maria and Julia, who would later marry the American agriculturalist John Hare Powel. Deveaux and his family were the foremost of the developers of the new plantation islands. Deveaux died in July 1812 leaving a sizable portion of the land of the islands of The Bahamas in his will.

== Sources ==
- Craton, Michael and Saunders, Gail: Islanders in the Stream: A History of the Bahamian People: Volume 1: From Aboriginal Times to the End of Slavery, University of Georgia Press (April 1, 1999) ISBN 0-8203-2122-2.
