= New Providence =

Caribbean island of the Bahamas

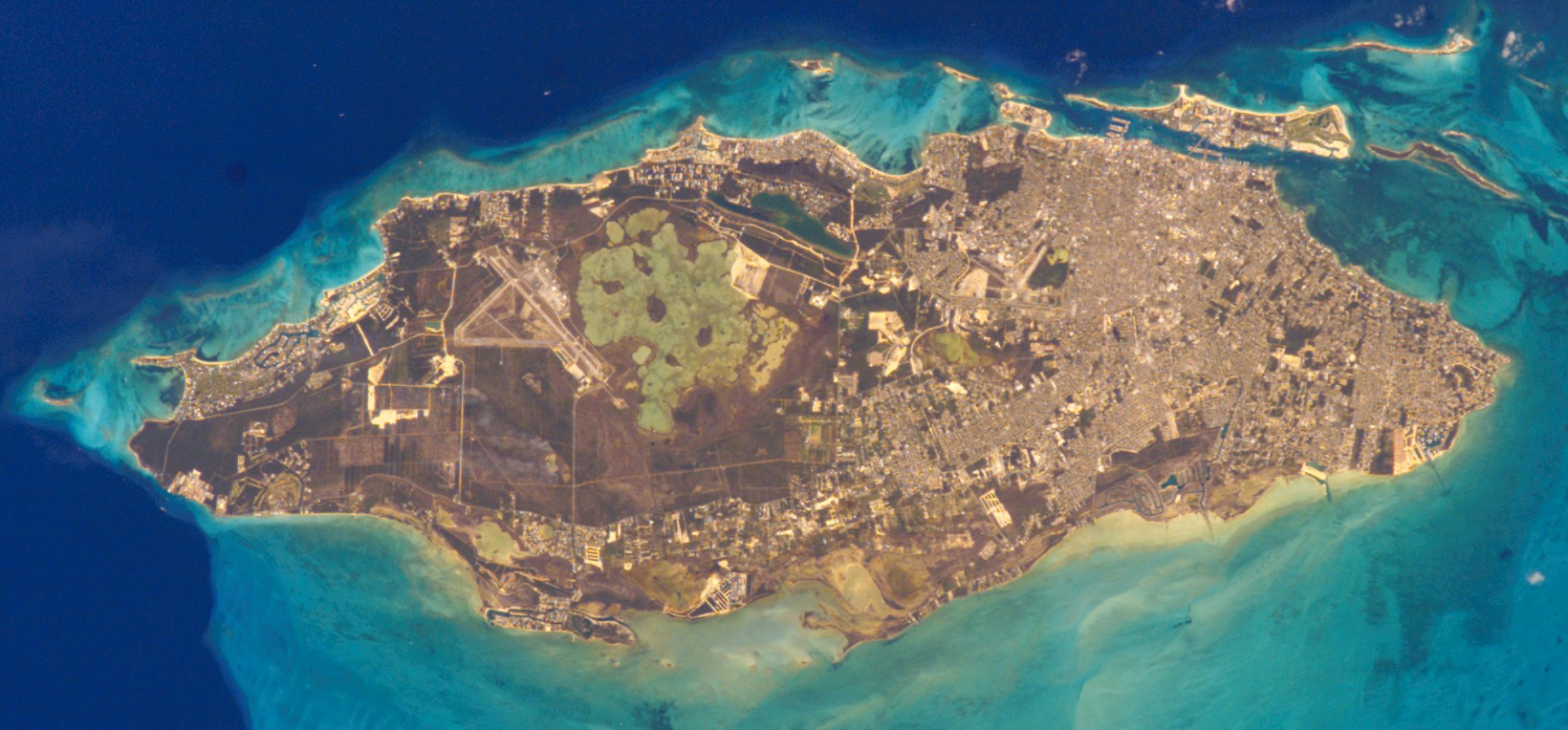
- Satellite image

- Location within Bahamas

Geography
- Location: Atlantic Ocean
- Coordinates: 25°1′48″N 77°24′18″W
- Archipelago: The Bahamas
- Area: 207 km^{2} (80 sq mi)
- Length: 34 km (21.1 mi)
- Width: 11 km (6.8 mi)
- Highest elevation: 5 m (16 ft)

Administration
- Bahamas
- Largest settlement: Nassau

Demographics
- Population: 296,522 (2022)
- Pop. density: 1,325.6/km^{2} (3433.3/sq mi)
- Ethnic groups: African 89%, European 8%, Asian and Hispanic 3%

Additional information
- Time zone: EST (UTC-5)
  - Summer (DST): EDT (UTC-4)
- ISO code: BS-NP

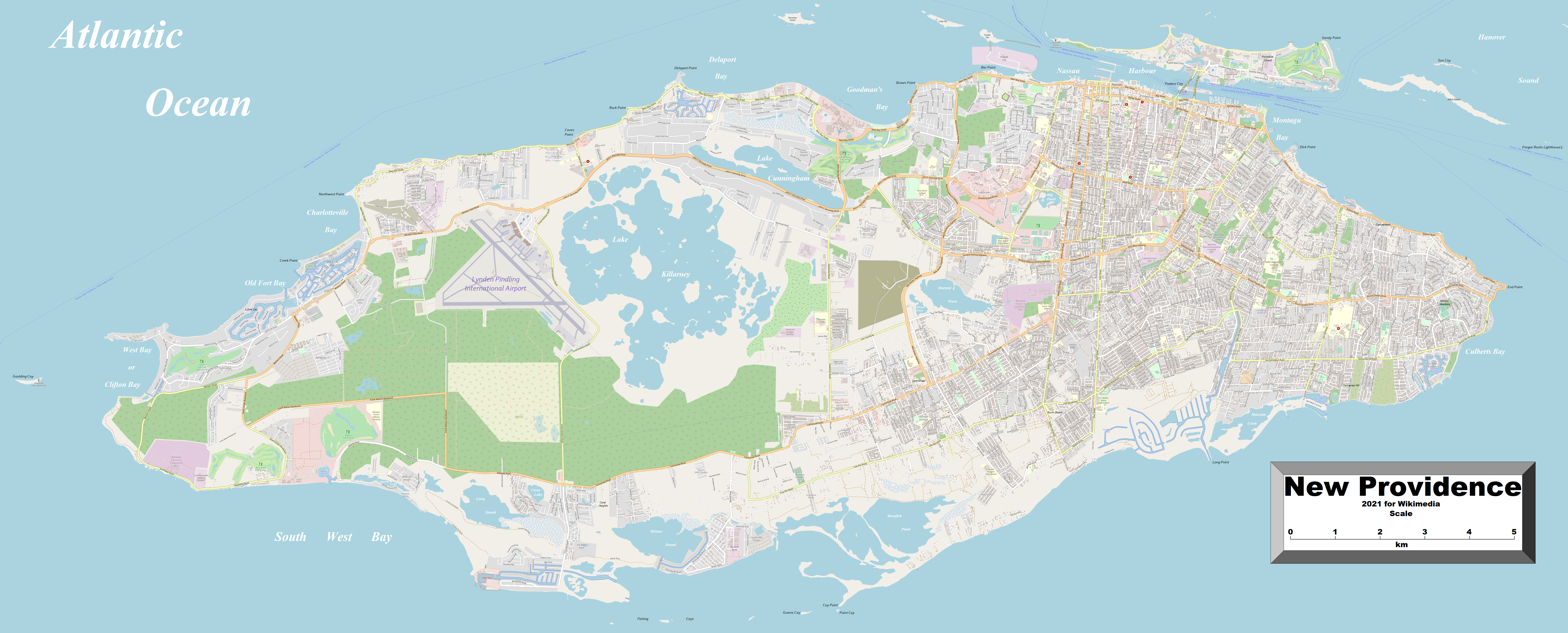
Enlargeable, detailed map of New Providence

New Providence is the most populous island in the Bahamas. On the eastern side of the island is the national capital city of Nassau; it had a population of 246,329 at the 2010 Census, and a population of 292,522 at the 2022 census. Nearly three quarters of the Bahamas' population lives on New Providence.

The island was originally under Spanish control following Christopher Columbus's discovery of the New World, but the Spanish government showed little interest in developing the island (and the Bahamas as a whole). Nassau, the island's largest city, was formerly known as Charles-town, but it was burned to the ground by the Spanish in 1684. It was laid out and renamed Nassau in 1695 by Nicholas Trott, the most successful Lord Proprietor, in honour of the Prince of Orange-Nassau who became William III of England.

The three branches of Bahamian Government — the executive, the legislative, and the judiciary — are all headquartered on New Providence. New Providence functions as the main commercial hub of the Bahamas. It is also home to more than 400 banks and trust companies, and its hotels and port account for more than two-thirds of the four million-plus tourists who visit the Bahamas annually. New Providence is the only part of the Bahamas that lacks local government. Local affairs are handled by the national government, but the island is divided into 24 supervisory districts.

Other settlements on New Providence include Grants Town, Bain Town, Fox Hill, Adelaide, Yamacraw, South Beach, Coral Harbour, Lyford Cay, Paradise Island, Sea Breeze, Centreville, The Grove (South) and The Grove (West Bay), Cable Beach, Delaporte, Gambier, Old Fort Bay, Carmichael Road, and Love Beach.

== Etymology ==
The Indigenous Lucayan people called the island Nema, meaning "middle-water". The name New Providence Island is derived from a 16th‐century governor who gave thanks to Divine Providence for his survival after a shipwreck. The "New" was added later to distinguish it from Providencia in Western Caribbean (now Colombia) used by pirates.

== History ==
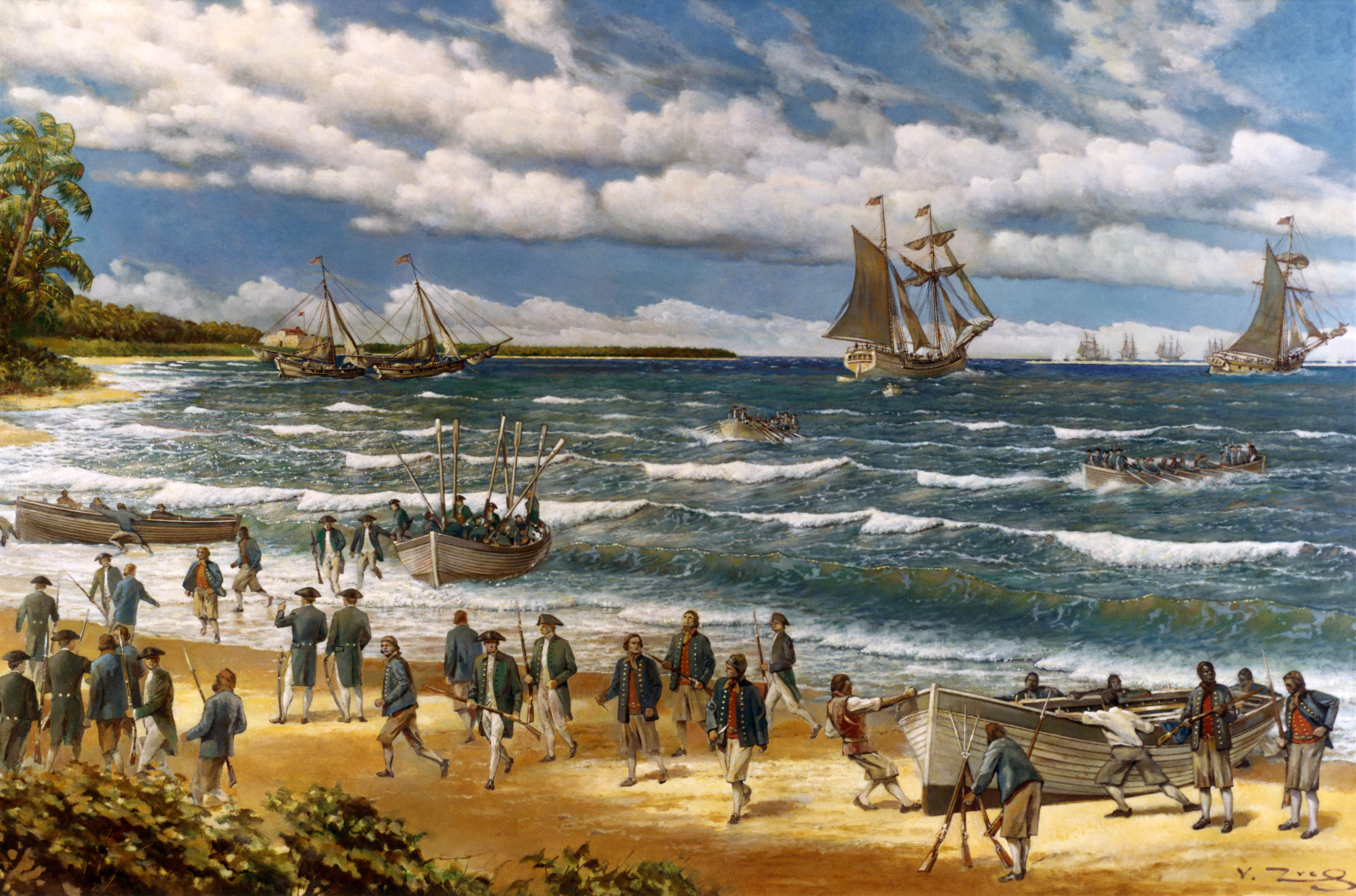
An artistic rendition of the Battle of Nassau

After 1670, Bermudian salt rakers gathering sea salt in Grand Turk and Inagua became regular visitors to the island. The first lasting European settlement was on Eleuthera in 1648, and then New Providence in 1666.

By 1670, there were over 900 people on the settlement of Charles-Town. Due to ineffective governors, Charles-Town was attacked by the French and Spanish navies, became a home base for pirates, and was eventually destroyed by a Spanish attack in 1684. However, two years later in 1686, new English colonists from Jamaica came and settled. They were called back by the governor of Jamaica, but they ignored this order. In 1695, Governor Nicolas Trott rebuilt the town and added a fort, both were called Nassau. However, the fort was heavily damaged in a Spanish attack in 1700 and the colonists eventually abandoned the fort in 1703 after a French and Spanish attack. Due to the lack of cannon and soldiers in the fort, New Providence soon became a home base for pirates. By 1713, there were over 1000 pirates in Nassau and they outnumbered the 400–500 law-abiding inhabitants; pirate Thomas Barrow even declared himself "Governor of New Providence". In 1718, Governor Woodes Rogers (sent by King George I of Great Britain) came in and offered a pardon for any pirate willing to give up his ways. Using his intelligence and threatening to execute them if they did not take the pardon, Rogers was eventually able to rid Nassau of pirates.

In February 1776, American Esek Hopkins led a squadron of over seven ships to raid the British-held island in order to secure supplies and munitions. In an event known as the Battle of Nassau, on March 3 and 4, Hopkins landed the first-ever amphibious assault by American military forces consisting of 250 Marines and sailors. Under the covering fire of the Providence and Wasp, the attackers overwhelmed Fort Montague. The British retreated to Fort Nassau, but then surrendered to Continental forces. The Americans managed to secure 88 cannon and 15 mortars, but most of the much desired gunpowder was evacuated before capture. Hopkins spent two weeks loading his ships with the booty before finally returning home.

The frigate South Carolina, of the South Carolina Navy, arrived at Havana on 12 January 1782. At Havana, after negotiations between Alexander Gillon and the Spanish, the South Carolina joined a force of 59 vessels carrying Spanish forces under the overall command of Bernardo de Galvez. On 22 April the expedition sailed to capture New Providence. By May 6 the whole fleet had reached New Providence and on 8 May the British colony surrendered. This was the third capture of New Providence by a foreign force during the American Revolutionary War.

The following year a British-American Loyalist expedition led by Colonel Andrew Deveaux, recaptured the islands in April 1783. The outnumbered force took Fort Montagu and three Spanish vessels. Following this, batteries were established on the ridge above Nassau whilst Deveaux bluffed the garrison with dummy troops and the threat of Native American allies. The Spanish governor, Don Antonio Claraco y Sanz with 700 of his men, capitulated on 18 April. It was one of the last actions of the entire war.

After the American Revolution, several thousand Loyalists and their slaves emigrated to New Providence and nearby islands, hoping to re-establish plantation agriculture. The shallow soils and sparse rainfall doomed this activity to failure, and by the early 19th century the Bahamas had become a nearly vacant archipelago. Salt raking continued here and there, wreck gleaning was profitable in Grand Bahama, but New Providence was the only island with any prosperity because of the large British military establishment. The fortresses began to crumble and were abandoned by 1850. New Providence afterwards had two periods of high economic success: during the American Civil War of 1861–65, when it was a highly popular port for blockade-runners serving the Confederate States of America; and during Prohibition, when it was a smuggling centre for distilled spirits.

== Tourist destination ==
By the late 19th century, New Providence had begun billing itself as the "sanitarium of the western hemisphere". Testimonials by residents and visitors emphasized its extremely mild climate with minimal daily temperature fluctuations (often as little as 3 °C (5 °F) in any given 12-hour period) and warm winters (a typical winter morning in the range of 21 to 23 °C (70 to 74 °F), excellent drainage, ample variety and number of Christian (Protestant) churches, well-tended and rectilinear roads, modern luxurious facilities, and native English speakers. Steam ships plied between the coastal southern United States, Cuba, and Nassau, and the popularity of the destination proceeded to grow.

By the late 1920s, New Providence had become well-established especially as an American vacation destination with many tourist facilities, including a deepened harbour for short-visit cruise ship visitors and hotels offering gambling.
