= History of the Bahamas =

The earliest arrival of people in the islands now known as The Bahamas was in the first millennium AD. The first inhabitants of the islands were the Lucayans, an Arawakan language-speaking Taino people, who arrived between about 500 and 800 AD from other islands of the Caribbean.

Recorded history began on 12 October 1492, when Christopher Columbus landed on the island of Guanahani, which he renamed San Salvador Island, on his first voyage to the New World. The earliest permanent European settlement was in 1648 on Eleuthera, settled by the British. During the 18th century slave trade, many purchased African slaves were brought to The Bahamas to work unpaid. Their descendants now constitute 85% of the Bahamian population. The Bahamas gained independence from the United Kingdom on July 10, 1973.

== Early history ==
Sometime between 500 and 800 AD, Indigenous people began crossing in dugout canoes from Hispaniola and/or Cuba to the Bahamas. Suggested routes for the earliest migrations have been from Hispaniola to the Caicos Islands, from Hispaniola or eastern Cuba to Great Inagua Island, and from central Cuba to Long Island (in the central Bahamas). William Keegan argues that the most likely route was from Hispaniola or Cuba to Great Inagua. Julian Granberry and Gary Vescelius argue for two migrations, from Hispaniola to the Turks and Caicos Islands, and from Cuba to Great Inagua.

From the initial colonisation(s), the Lucayan expanded throughout the Bahamas in some 800 years (c. 700 – c. 1500), growing to a population of about 40,000. Population density at the time of first European contact was highest in the south-central area of The Bahamas, declining towards the north, reflecting the migration pattern and progressively shorter time of occupation of the northern islands. Known Lucayan settlement sites are confined to the nineteen largest islands in the archipelago, or to smaller cays located less than one km. from those islands. Population density in the southernmost Bahamas remained lower, probably due to the drier climate there (less than 800 mm of rain a year on Great Inagua Island and the Turks and Caicos Islands and only slightly higher on Acklins and Crooked Islands and Mayaguana).

== European exploration ==
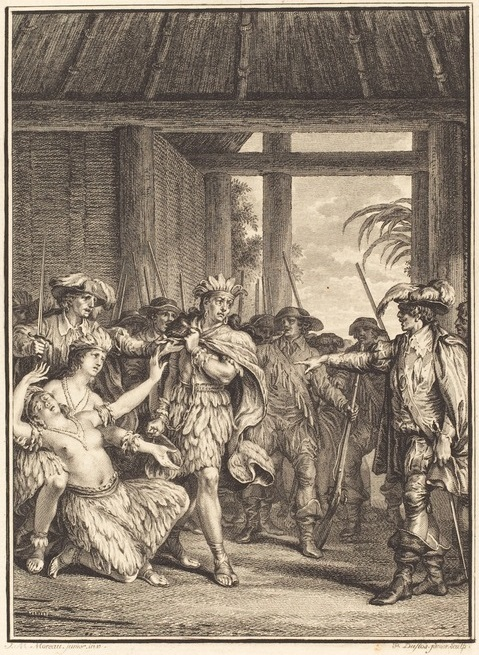
Depiction of Christopher Columbus seizing the Guanahani shortly after landing in the Bahamas in 1492

In 1492, Christopher Columbus sailed from Spain on his first voyage with three ships, the Niña, the Pinta, and the flagship, Santa Maria, seeking a direct route to Asia. On 12 October, Columbus reached an island in the Bahamas and claimed it for Spain, an event long regarded by Europeans as the "discovery" of America. This island was called Guanahani by the Lucayan, and San Salvador by the Spanish. The identity of the first American landfall by Columbus remains controversial, but many authors accept Samuel E. Morison's identification of Columbus' San Salvador as what was later called Watling (or Watling's) Island. Its name has been officially changed to San Salvador. Columbus visited several other islands in the Bahamas before sailing to present-day Cuba and afterwards to Hispaniola.

The Bahamas held little interest to the Spanish except as a source of slave labor. Nearly the entire population of Lucayan (almost 40,000 people total) were transported to other islands as laborers over the next 30 years. When the Spanish decided to remove the remaining Lucayans to Hispaniola in 1520, they could find only eleven. The islands remained abandoned and depopulated for 130 years afterwards. With no gold to be found, and the population removed, the Spanish effectively abandoned the Bahamas. They retained titular claims to them until the Peace of Paris in 1783, when they ceded them to Britain in exchange for East Florida.

When Europeans first landed on the islands, they reported the Bahamas were lushly forested. Colonists later cleared the land to develop sugarcane plantations. The forests have not regrown and have not been replanted.

For many years, historians believed that the Bahamas was not colonised until the 17th century. However, recent studies show that there may have been attempts of colonisation by groups from Spain, France, Britain, and the Netherlands. In 1565 a group of French Huguenots settled on Abaco and were never heard of again.

== Early English settlement ==
In 1648, a group from Bermuda called "The Company of Adventurers for the Plantation of the Islands of Eleutheria", which was led by William Sayle, sailed to the Bahamas to found a colony. These early settlers were Puritans and republicans. Bermuda was becoming overcrowded, and the Bahamas offered both religious and political freedom and economic opportunity. The larger of the company's two ships, the William, wrecked on the reef at the north end of what is now called Eleuthera Island, with the loss of all provisions.

Despite the arrival of additional settlers, including Europeans, slaves and former African slaves from Bermuda and the receipt of relief supplies from Virginia and New England, the Eleuthera colony struggled for many years, hampered by poor soil, fighting between settlers, and conflict with the Spanish. In the mid-1650s, many of the settlers returned to Bermuda. The remaining settlers founded communities on Harbour Island and Saint George's Cay (Spanish Wells) at the north end of Eleuthera. In 1670 about 20 families lived in the Eleuthera communities.

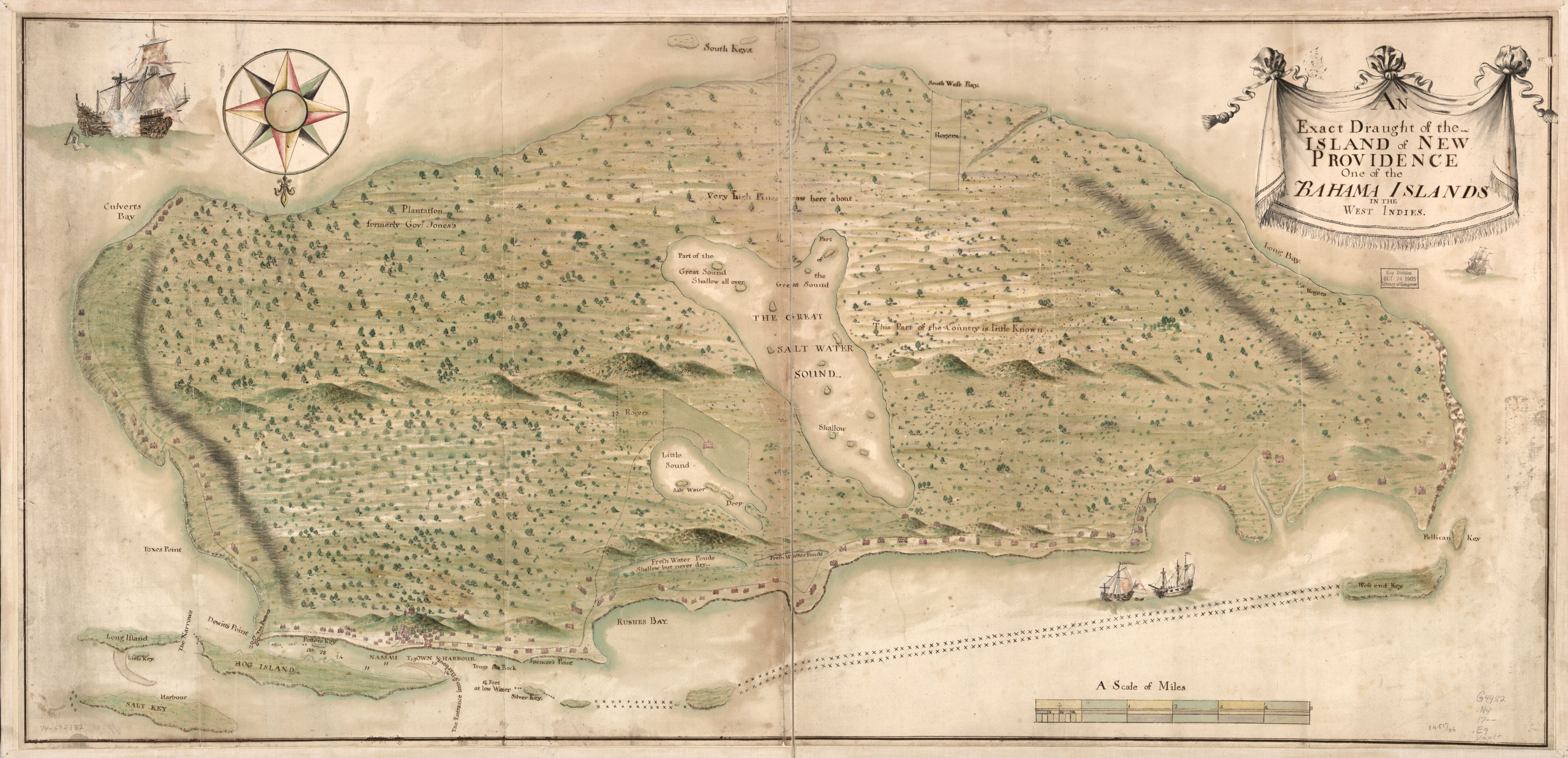
Map of New Providence in 1751. Settled in the mid-1600s, the island quickly became the centre of population and commerce in the Bahamas.

In 1666 other colonists from Bermuda settled on New Providence, which soon became the centre of population and commerce in the Bahamas, with almost 500 people living on the island by 1670. Unlike the Eleutherians, who were primarily farmers, the first settlers on New Providence made their living from the sea, salvaging (mainly Spanish) wrecks, making salt, and taking fish, turtles, conchs and ambergris. Farmers from Bermuda soon followed the seamen to New Providence, where they found good, plentiful land. Neither the Eleutherian colony nor the settlement on New Providence had any legal standing under English law. In 1670, the Proprietors of Carolina were issued a patent for the Bahamas, but the governors sent by the Proprietors had difficulty imposing their authority on the independent-minded residents of New Providence.

The early settlers continued to live much as they had in Bermuda, fishing, hunting turtles, whales, and seals, finding ambergris, making salt on the drier islands, cutting the abundant hardwoods of the islands for lumber, dyewood and medicinal bark; and wrecking, or salvaging wrecks. The Bahamas were close to the sailing routes between Europe and the Caribbean, so shipwrecks in the islands were common, and wrecking was the most lucrative occupation available to the Bahamians.

=== Republic of Pirates ===
The Bahamians soon came into conflict with the Spanish over the salvaging of wrecks. The Bahamian wreckers drove the Spanish away from their wrecked ships, and attacked Spanish salvagers, seizing goods the Spanish had already recovered from the wrecks. When the Spanish raided the Bahamas, the Bahamians in turn commissioned privateers against Spain, even though England and Spain were at peace. In 1684, the Spanish burned the settlements on New Providence and Eleuthera, after which they were largely abandoned. New Providence was settled a second time in 1686 by colonists from Jamaica.

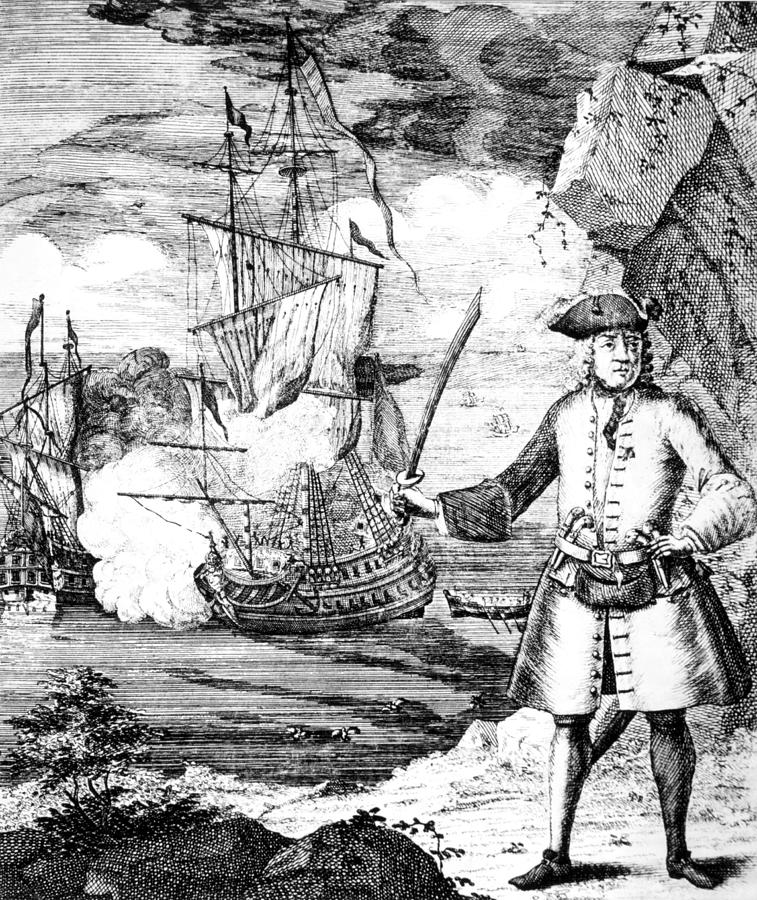
Pirate captain Henry Every on shore while his ship the Fancy engages another vessel. Every eluded the authorities after supposedly bribing the governor appointed by the Proprietors of Carolina

In the 1690s, English privateers (England was then at war with France) made a base in the Bahamas. In 1696 Henry Every (or Avery), using the assumed name Henry Bridgeman, brought his ship Fancy, loaded with pirates' loot, into Nassau harbor. Avery bribed the governor, Nicholas Trott (uncle of the Nicholas Trott who presided at the trial of Stede Bonnet), with gold and silver, and by leaving him the Fancy, still loaded with 50 tons of elephant tusks and 100 barrels of gunpowder. Following peace with France in 1697, many of the privateers became pirates. From this time the pirates increasingly made their base at Nassau, the Bahamian capital, which had been founded in 1670 as Charles Town and rebuilt under its present name in 1695. The governors appointed by the Proprietors usually made a show of suppressing the pirates, but most were accused of dealing with them. By 1701 England was at war with France and Spain. In 1703, and again in 1706, combined French-Spanish fleets attacked and sacked Nassau, after which some settlers left, and the Proprietors gave up on trying to govern the islands.

With no functioning government in the Bahamas, English privateers operated from Nassau as their base, in what has been called a "privateers' republic", which lasted for eleven years. The raiders attacked French and Spanish ships, while French and Spanish forces burned Nassau several times. The War of the Spanish Succession ended in 1714, but some privateers were slow to get the news, or reluctant to accept it, and slipped into piracy. One estimate puts at least 1,000 pirates in the Bahamas in 1713, outnumbering the 200 families of more permanent settlers.

Jolly Roger of the Flying Gang.

The "privateers' republic" in Nassau became a "pirates' republic". At least 20 pirate captains used Nassau or other places in the Bahamas as a home port during this period, including Henry Jennings, Edward Teach (Blackbeard), Benjamin Hornigold and Stede Bonnet. Many settler families moved from New Providence to Eleuthera or Abaco to escape harassment from the pirates. On the other hand, residents of Harbor Island were happy to serve as middlemen for the pirates, as merchants from New England and Virginia came there to exchange needed supplies for pirate plunder. Piracy provoked frequent and brutal but ineffective retaliatory attacks by the French and Spanish.

== Reasserting British control ==
Starting in 1713, Woodes Rogers had conceived the idea of leading an expedition to Madagascar to suppress the pirates there and establish it as a British colony. Rogers' friends Richard Steele and Joseph Addison eventually convinced him to tackle the pirates' nest in the Bahamas, instead. Rogers and others formed a company to fund the venture. They persuaded the Proprietors of Carolina to surrender the government of the Bahamas to the king, while retaining title to the land. In 1717 King George appointed Rogers governor of the Bahamas and issued a proclamation granting a pardon to any pirate who surrendered to a British governor within one year.

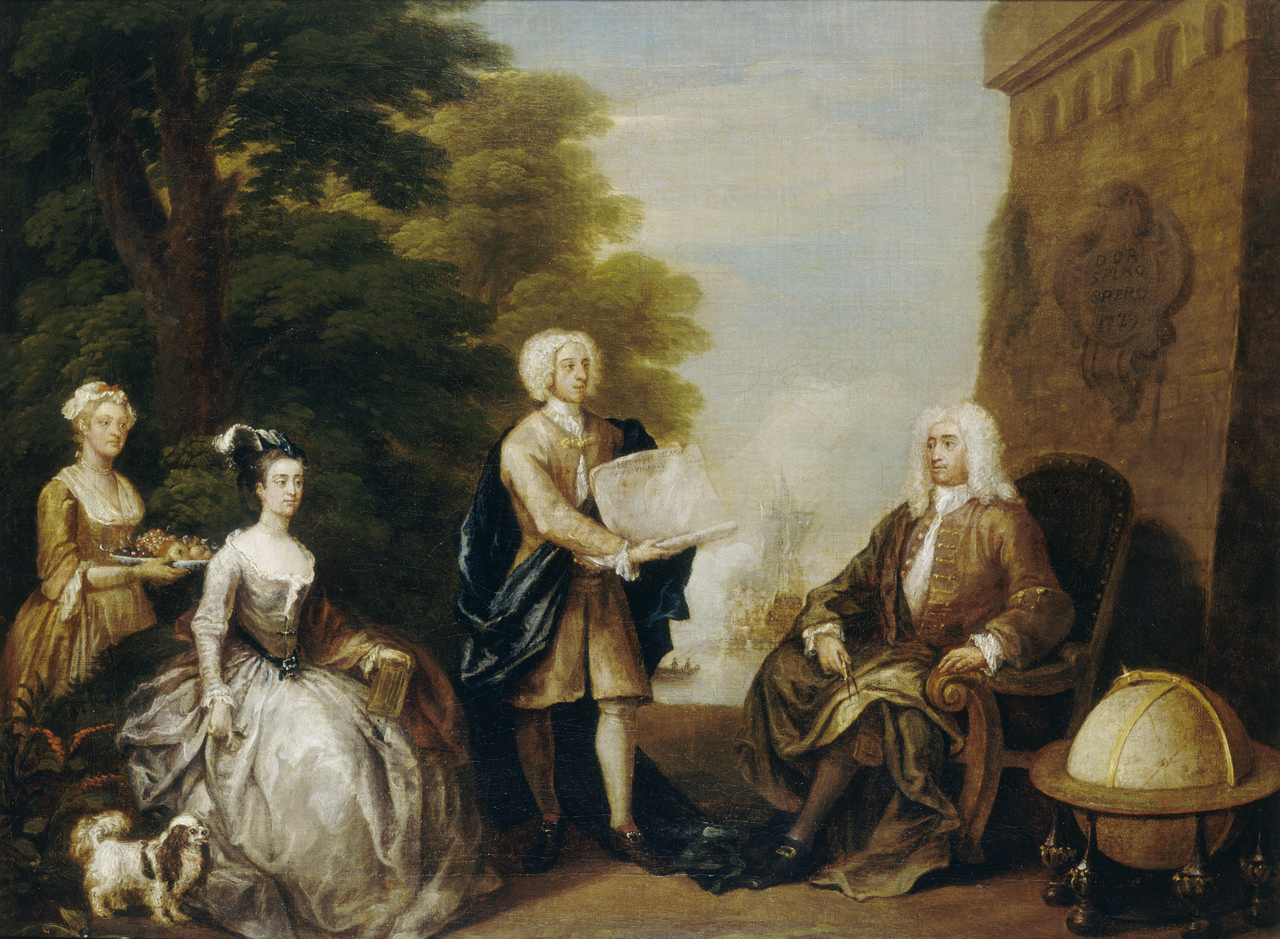
Woodes Rogers and his family by William Hogarth, 1729. Rogers, the first royal governor of the Bahamas, is seated as he is shown a map of New Providence.

Word of the appointment of a new governor and of the offer of pardons reached Nassau ahead of Rogers and his forces. Some of the pirates were willing to accept a pardon and retire from piracy. Henry Jennings and Christopher Winter, sailed off to find British authorities to confirm their acceptance of the amnesty.

Others were not ready to give up. Many of those were Jacobites, supporters of the House of Stuart, who identified as enemies of the Hanoverian King George. Still others simply identified as rebels, or thought they were better off as pirates than trying to earn an honest living. When a Royal Navy ship brought official word to Nassau of the pardon offer, many pirates planned to accept. Soon, however, the recalcitrant parties gained the upper hand, eventually forcing the Navy ship to leave.

Blackbeard, Stede Bonnet, Nicholas Brown and Edmond Condent left the Bahamas for other territories. Charles Vane, with John Rackham and Edward England in his crew, came to prominence at this time. Vane worked to organise resistance to the anticipated arrival of Royal authority, even appealing to James Francis Edward Stuart, the Stuart pretender, for aid in holding the Bahamas and capturing Bermuda for the Stuarts. As aid from the Stuarts failed to materialise and the date for Rogers' arrival approached, Vane and his crew prepared to leave Nassau.

Woodes Rogers arrived in Nassau in late July 1718, with his own 460-ton warship, three ships belonging to his company, and an escort of three ships of the Royal Navy. Vane's ship was trapped in Nassau harbor. His crew set that ship on fire, sending it towards Rogers' ships, and escaped in the ensuing confusion in a smaller ship they had seized from another pirate. The remaining population welcomed Rogers; they comprised about 200 settlers and 500 to 700 pirates who wanted to receive pardons, most prominently Benjamin Hornigold. After the pirates' surrender, the Proprietors leased their land in the Bahamas to Rogers' company for 21 years.

Rogers controlled Nassau, but Charles Vane was loose and threatening to drive the governor and his forces out. Learning that the King of Spain wanted to expel English from the islands, Rogers worked to improve the defenses of Nassau. He lost nearly 100 men of the new forces due to an unidentified disease, and the Navy ships left for other assignments. Rogers sent four of his ships to Havana to assure the Spanish governor that he was suppressing piracy and to trade for supplies. The crews of ex-pirates and men who had come with Rogers all turned to piracy. The ex-pirate Benjamin Hornigold later caught ten men at Green Turtle Cay as part of Rogers' suppression effort. Eight were found guilty and hanged in front of the fort.

Vane attacked several small settlements in the Bahamas but, after he refused to attack a stronger French frigate, he was deposed for cowardice and replaced as captain by John Rackham. Vane never returned to the Bahamas; he was eventually caught, convicted and executed in Jamaica. After nearly being captured by Jamaican privateers, and hearing that the king had extended the deadline for pardons for piracy, Rackham and his crew returned to Nassau to surrender to Woodes Rogers.

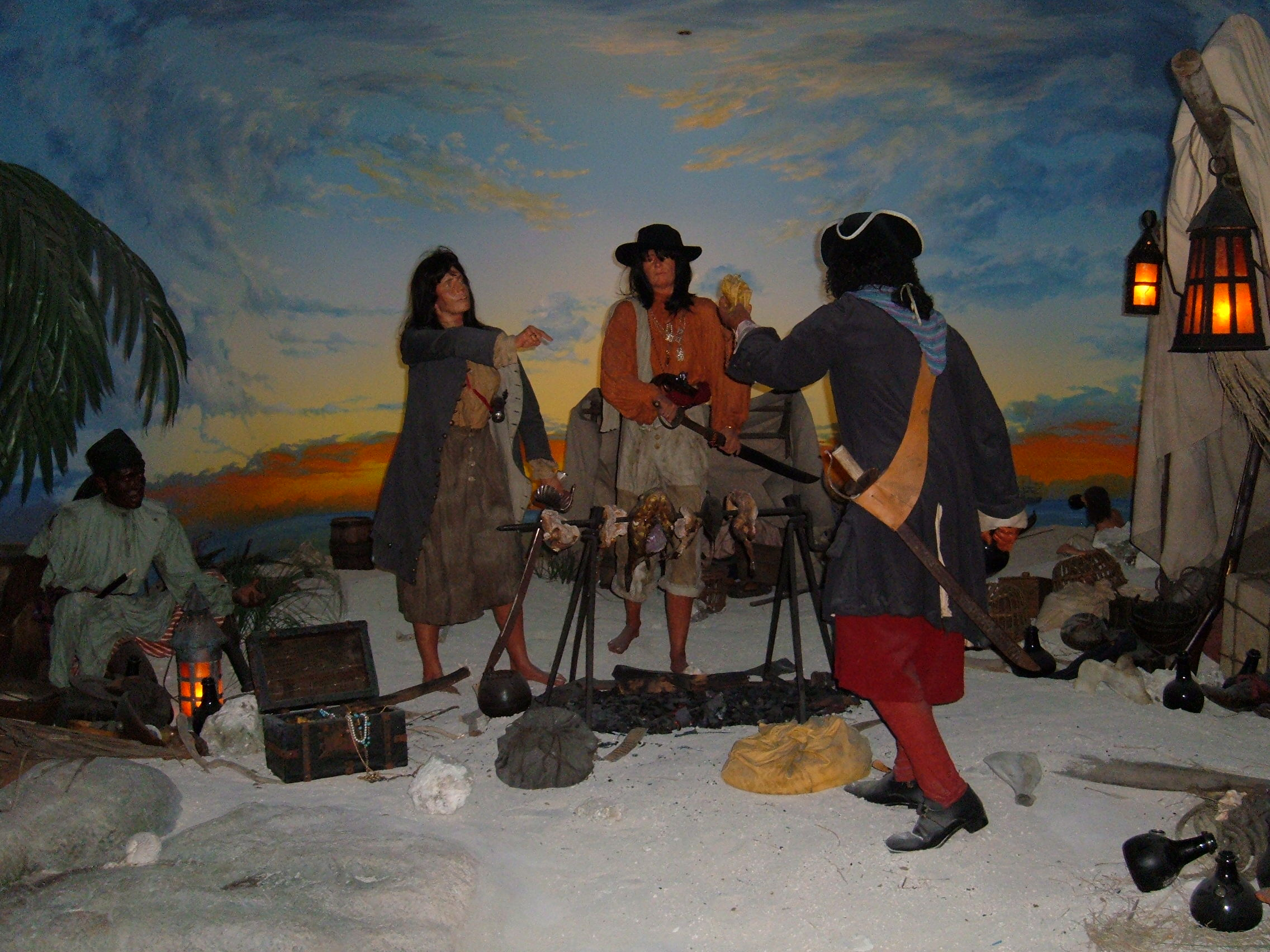
Diarama of Anne Bonny and Mary Read at Nassau harbor at the Pirates of Nassau Museum in Nassau. The two began their pirating careers at Nassau.

In August of 1720, Rackham stole the sloop William out of Nassau harbor. Alongside him was a small crew that included female pirates Anne Bonny and Mary Read. 61 days later in October, Rackham, Bonny and Read were captured and taken to Jamaica. They were convicted of piracy, and Rackham was executed. Bonny and Read were sent to prison, after claiming to be pregnant and therefore excluded from execution. Read died in prison, while Bonny was likely quietly released, and died in obscurity in late 1733.

When Britain and Spain went to war again in 1719, many of the ex-pirates were commissioned by the British government as privateers. A Spanish invasion fleet set out for the Bahamas, but was diverted to Pensacola, Florida when it was seized by the French. Rogers continued to improve the defenses of Nassau, spending his personal fortune and going heavily into debt to do so. In 1720, the Spaniards finally attacked Nassau. Rogers returned to Britain in 1722 to plead for repayment of the money he had borrowed to build up Nassau, only to find he had been replaced as governor. He was sent to debtors' prison, although his creditors later absolved his debts, gaining him release.

After the publication in 1724 of A General History of the Robberies and Murders of the Most Notorious Pirates, which praised Rogers' efforts to suppress piracy in the Bahamas, his fortunes began to improve. The king awarded him a pension, retroactive to 1721. In 1728 Rogers was appointed Governor of the Bahamas for a second term. He dissolved the colony's assembly when it would not approve taxes to repair Nassau's defenses. He died in Nassau in 1732.

== Latter 18th century ==
In 1741, Governor John Tinker and Peter Henry Bruce constructed Fort Montague. Additionally, the Governor also reported a privateering boom in the Thirteen Colonies in North America. He also reported that over 2300 sumptuous houses were built. In 1768, Governor William Shirley filled in mosquito-breeding swamps and extended Nassau.

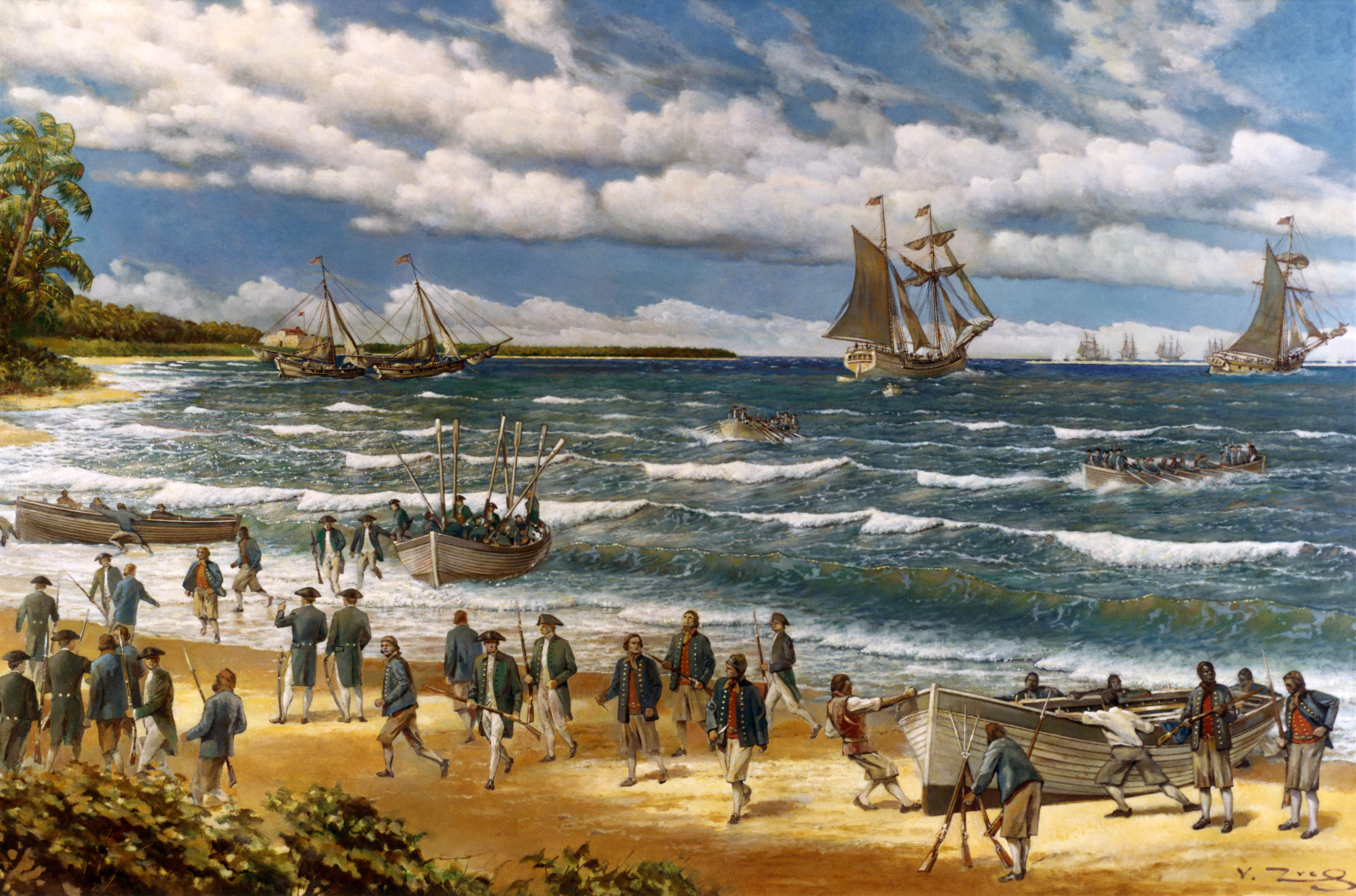
American forces lands at New Providence during the American Revolutionary War. The landing resulted in a two-week occupation of Nassau in 1776

During the American War of Independence, the Bahamas was attacked by American and allied forces on several occasions. In 1776, American forces launched an amphibious assault against Nassau, resulting in an occupation lasting a single day. In 1782, Spanish forces under General Galvez captured the Bahamas in 1782. A British-American Loyalist expedition led by Colonel Andrew Deveaux, recaptured the islands in 1783.

After the American Revolution, many American Loyalists came to the Bahamas. Most of East Florida's Loyalists who left went to the Bahamas. East Florida had a much larger population than the Bahamas at the time as in 1783 it was estimated some 17,000 lived there while 4,002 lived in the Bahamas as per a report done by a British officer in July of that year. The number of Loyalists who came to the Bahamas is somewhat unclear but is believed to be between 4,000 and 7,000 depending on the source. Some Loyalists even brought their slaves with them and the practice of slavery continued until 1834 when it was formally abolished. The Loyalists attempted to engage in cotton cultivation but were largely unsuccessful due to the poor soil quality of the islands and the poor soil quality also hindered other crops done by settlers. The population of the Bahamas during the 1780s saw a variety of changes including in population which tripled between 1783 and 1789. It also became more decentralized as a smaller portion of the population was living on New Providence as the population of the Out Islands grew plus the racial makeup changed as in 1783 the ratio of European to African inhabitants was equal and by 1785 it was 2 to 1. Also in the 1780s several thousand slaves were imported with several hundred coming directly from Africa while the rest came from the Caribbean.

Most of the current inhabitants in the islands are descended from the slaves brought to work on the Loyalist plantations. In addition, thousands of captive Africans, who were liberated from foreign slave ships by the British navy after the abolition of the British slave trade in 1807, were resettled as free persons in the Bahamas.

== 19th century ==
In the early 1820s, following the Adams–Onís Treaty ceding Florida from Spain to the United States, hundreds of African slaves and Black Seminoles escaped from Florida, most settling on Andros Island in the Bahamas. Three hundred escaped in a mass flight in 1823. While the flow was reduced by federal construction of a lighthouse at Cape Florida in 1825, slaves continued to find freedom in the Bahamas. In August 1834, the traditional plantation life ended with the British emancipation of slaves throughout most of its colonies. Freedmen chose to work on their own small plots of land when possible.

In the 1830s and 1840s, tensions rose between Britain and the United States after American merchant ships, part of the coastwise slave trade, put into Nassau or were wrecked on its reefs. These included the Hermosa (1840) and the Creole (1841), the latter brought in after a slave revolt on board. Britain had notified nations that slaves brought into Bahama and Bermuda waters would be forfeited and freed the slaves, refusing US efforts to recover them. In 1853 Britain and the US signed a claims treaty and submitted to arbitration for claims dating to 1814; they paid each other in 1855.

With emancipation, Caribbean societies inherited a rigid racial stratification that was reinforced by the unequal distribution of wealth and power. The three-tier race structure, of whites, mixed-race, and primarily blacks, who comprised the large majority, existed well into the 1940s and in some societies beyond. Like African Americans, many also have European and Native American ancestry. Caribbean societies continue to struggle with racial issues.

The Bahamas during the American Civil War prospered as a base for Confederate blockade-running, bringing in cotton to be shipped to the mills of England and running out arms and munitions. None of these provided any lasting prosperity to the islands, nor did attempts to grow different kinds of crops for export.

== Colonial 20th century ==
In 1911, there was a short-lived movement to make the Bahamas part of Canada. Although the movement enjoyed the support of many in Nassau and from the head of Sun Life, a Canadian insurance company, the movement failed. The failure of the movement was, in part, due to the British government's opposition to uniting a predominantly black colony with a predominantly white country.

In World War I organisations such as the Imperial Order of the Daughters of Empire and the Bahamas Red Cross Guild began collecting money, food and clothing for soldiers and civilians in Europe. "The Gallant Thirty" Bahamians set out to join the British West Indies Regiment as early as 1915 and as many as 1,800 served in the armed forces of Canada, Britain and the United States.

=== World War II ===
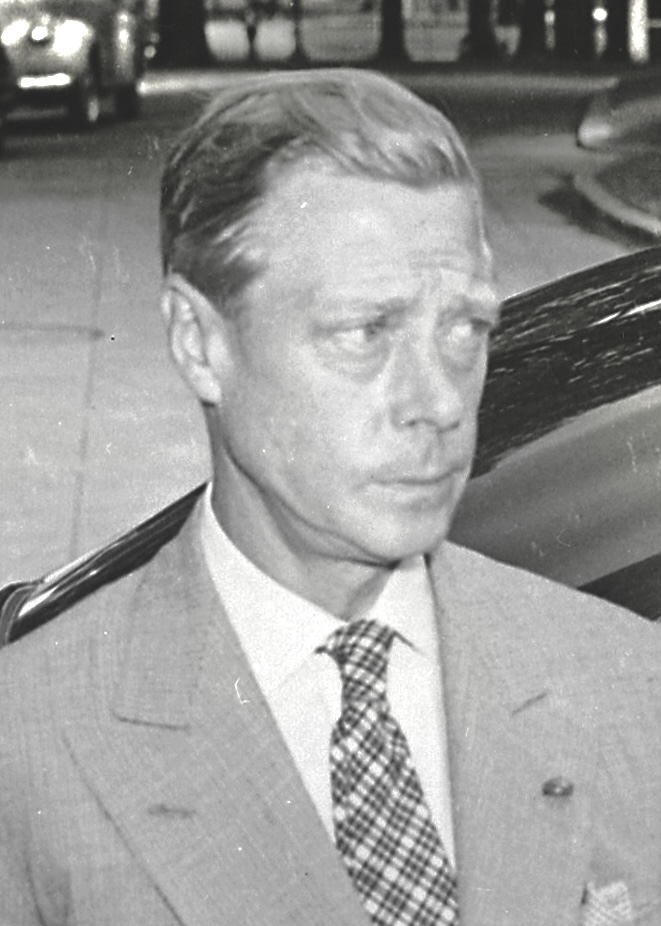
The Duke of Windsor in August 1945, several months after he stepped down as the governor of the Bahamas

Oakes Field, the Bahamas first airport, was opened in Nassau in January 1940. It was named after Harry Oakes, a millionaire who made a large contribution. Prior to that, aviation in the Bahamas was largely carried out by seaplanes.

The Duke of Windsor was installed as governor of the Bahamas, arriving at that post in August 1940 with his new wife. They were appalled at the condition of Government House, but they "tried to make the best of a bad situation." He did not enjoy the position, and referred to the islands as "a third-class British colony". He opened the small local parliament on October 29, 1940, and they visited the 'Out Islands' that November, which caused some controversy because of on whose yacht they were cruising. The British Foreign Office strenuously objected when the Duke and Duchess planned to tour aboard a yacht belonging to a Swedish magnate, Axel Wenner-Gren, whom American intelligence wrongly believed to be a close friend of Luftwaffe commander Hermann Göring. The Duke was praised, however, for his efforts to combat poverty on the islands, although he was as contemptuous of the Bahamians as he was of most non-white peoples of the Empire. He was also praised for his resolution of civil unrest over low wages in Nassau in June 1942, when there was a "full-scale riot," even though he blamed the trouble on "mischief makers – communists" and "men of Central European Jewish descent, who had secured jobs as a pretext for obtaining a deferment of draft". The Duke resigned the post on 16 March 1945. (Note: Higham places the date of his resignation as 15 March, and that he left on 5 April.)

==== Canadian garrison ====
In April 1942 the United Kingdom asked Canada to provide military support in Nassau, in part to provide protection services to H.R.H. the Duke of Windsor. The No. 33 company of the Veterans Guard of Canada was raised and arrived in June. No. 33 company were relieved in 1943 by a company of The Pictou Highlanders. The Canadian garrison left Nassau in 1946.

=== Post-World War II ===
The wartime airfield became Nassau's international airport in 1957 and helped spur the growth of mass tourism, which accelerated after Havana was closed to American tourists in 1961. Freeport, on the island of Grand Bahama, was established as a free trade zone in the 1950s. Bank secrecy combined with the lack of corporate and income taxes led to a rapid growth in the offshore financial sector during the postwar years.

Modern political development began after World War II. The first political parties were formed in the 1950s. The Progressive Liberal Party was formed in 1953, and the United Bahamian Party was formed in 1956.

Bahamians achieved self-government in 1964, with Sir Roland Symonette, of the United Bahamian Party, as the first Premier. Sir Lynden O. Pindling, leader of the Progressive Liberal Party, became the first black Premier of the colony in 1967, and in 1968 the title was changed to Prime Minister.

== Independent Bahamas ==
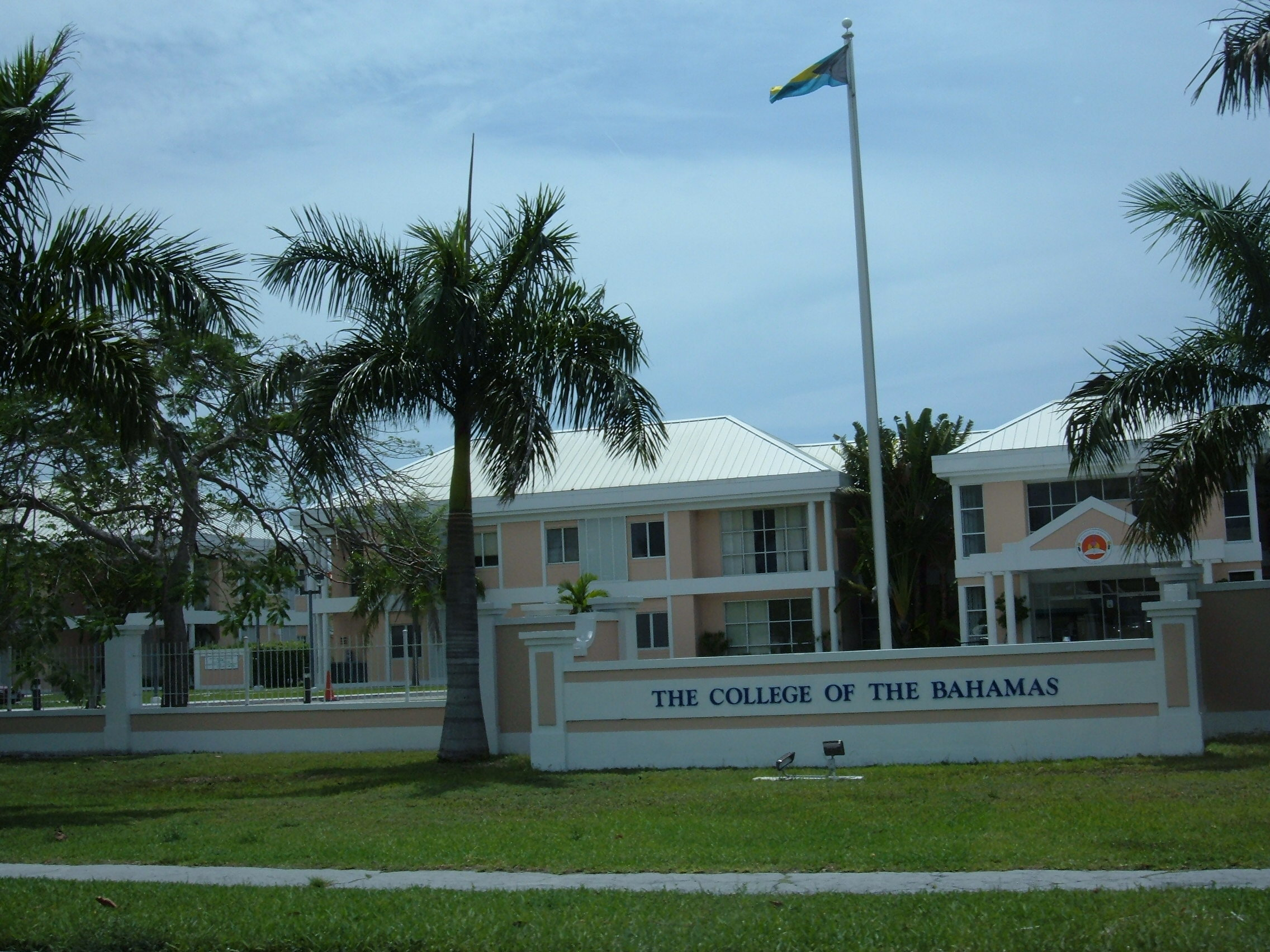
Entrance to the College of the Bahamas in 2006. Established in 1974, it was later reorganised as the University of the Bahamas

The Bahamas achieved full independence as a Commonwealth realm within the Commonwealth of Nations on 10 July 1973. Sir Milo Butler was appointed the first Governor-General of the Bahamas (the official representative of Queen Elizabeth II) shortly after independence. Pindling was prime minister until 1992. He was succeeded by Hubert Ingraham, leader of the Free National Movement, who was prime minister until 2002.

The College of the Bahamas was founded in 1974 and provided the nation's higher or tertiary education. The college was chartered in 2016 as the University of the Bahamas, offering baccalaureate, masters and associate degrees, on three campuses and teaching and research centres throughout the Bahamas.

Based on the twin pillars of tourism and offshore finance, the Bahamian economy has prospered since the 1950s. However, there remain significant challenges in areas such as education, health care, housing, international narcotics trafficking and illegal immigration from Haiti.

In the 2002 Bahamian general election, the PLP returned to power under Perry Christie. Ingraham returned to power from 2007 to 2012, followed by Christie again from 2012 to 2017. With economic growth faltering, Bahamians re-elected the FNM in 2017, with Hubert Minnis becoming the fourth prime minister.

In September 2019, Hurricane Dorian struck the Abaco Islands and Grand Bahama at Category 5 intensity, devastating the northwestern Bahamas. The storm inflicted at least US$7 billion in damages and killed more than 50 people, with 1,300 people still missing.

In September 2021, Prime Minister Hubert Minnis lost in a snap election as the economy struggles to recover from its deepest crash since at least 1971. Progressive Liberal Party (PLP) won 32 of the 39 seats in the House of Assembly. Free National Movement (FNM), led by Minnis, took the remaining seats. On 17 September 2021, the leader of the Progressive Liberal Party (PLP) Phillip “Brave” Davis was sworn in as the new Prime Minister of the Bahamas.

In May 2026, Prime Minister Phillip Davis successfully won re-election as the people "chose progress" instead of the FNM's agenda. The PLP took 31 seats in the house of Assembly. Free National Movement led by Pintard took the remaining.

== See also ==
- British colonisation of the Americas
- British Bahamas
- History of the British West Indies
- History of the Caribbean
- Politics of the Bahamas
