= Outline of the Bahamas =

Island country in the Caribbean

The Flag of the Bahamas

The Coat of arms of the Bahamas

The location of The Bahamas

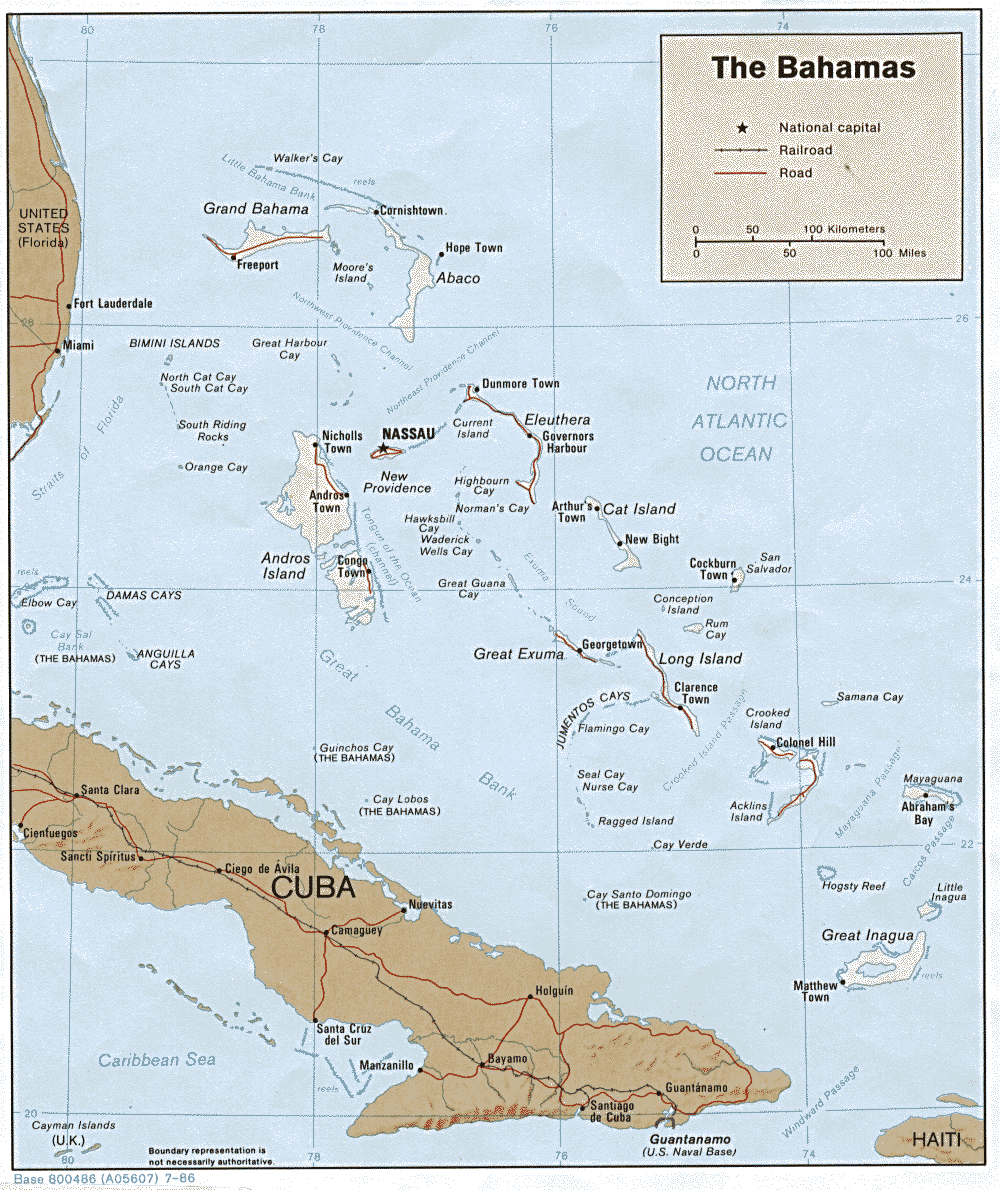
An enlargeable relief map of the Commonwealth of The Bahamas

The following outline is provided as an overview of and topical guide to The Bahamas:

Commonwealth of The Bahamas – sovereign island country comprising an archipelago of seven hundred islands and two thousand cays. The Bahamas are located in the Atlantic Ocean, southeast of Florida and the United States, north of Cuba, the island of Hispaniola and the Caribbean, and northwest of the British Overseas Territory of the Turks and Caicos Islands.

== General reference ==
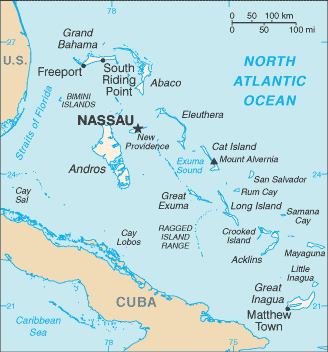
An enlargeable basic map of The Bahamas

- Pronunciation:
- Common English country names: The Bahamas or the Bahama Islands
- Official English country name: The Commonwealth of The Bahamas
- Common endonym(s):
- Official endonym(s):
- Adjectival(s): Bahamian
- Demonym(s):
- ISO country codes: BS, BHS, 044
- ISO region codes: See ISO 3166-2:BS
- Internet country code top-level domain: .bs

== Geography of the Bahamas ==
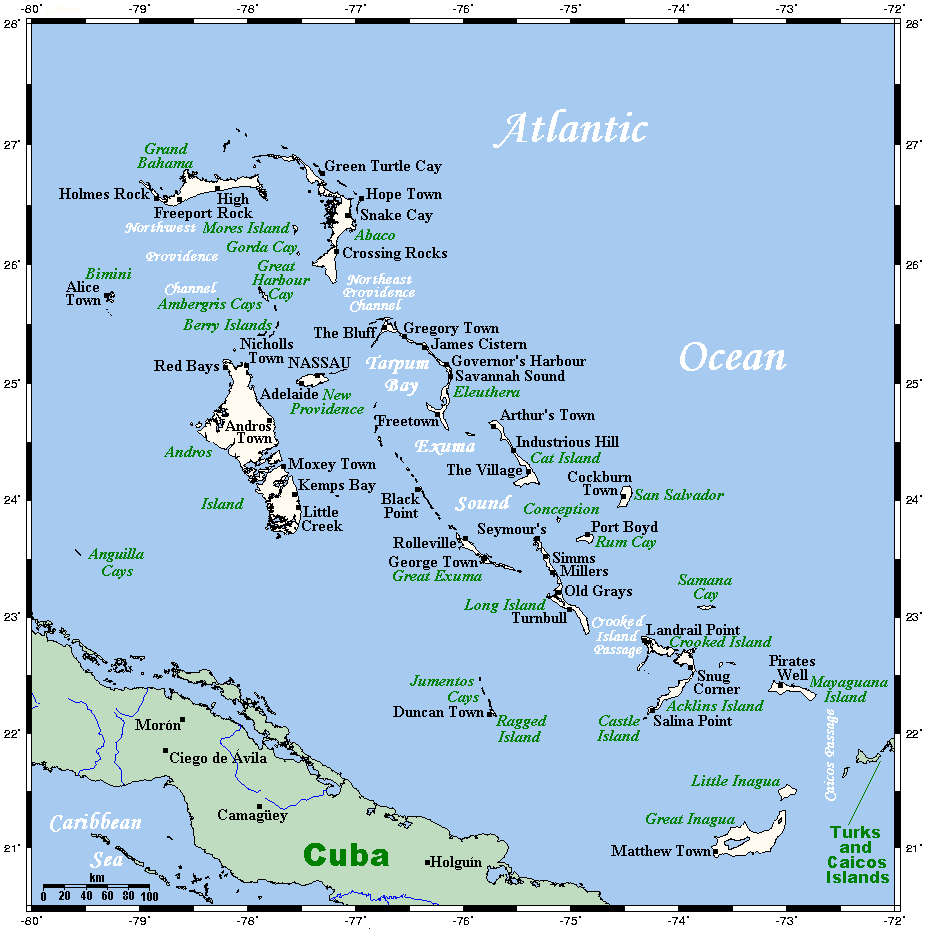
An enlargeable map of The Bahamas

- The Bahamas is...
  - an archipelago
  - a country
    - an island country consisting of two thousand cays and seven hundred islands
    - a nation state
    - a Commonwealth realm
- Location:
  - Northern Hemisphere and Western Hemisphere
    - North America (off the East Coast of the United States, southeast of Florida)
  - Atlantic Ocean
    - North Atlantic Ocean
      - Caribbean
        - West Indies
          - Lucayan Archipelago
  - Time zone: Eastern Standard Time (UTC−05), Eastern Daylight Time (UTC−04)
  - Extreme points of the Bahamas
    - High: Mount Alvernia on Cat Island 63 m (207 ft)
    - Low: North Atlantic Ocean 0 m
  - Land boundaries: none
  - Coastline: North Atlantic Ocean 3,542 km
- Population of the Bahamas: 330,549 (2007) – 177th most populous country
- Area of the Bahamas: 13,878 square kilometres (5,358 sq mi) – 160th largest country
- Maps of the Bahamas
  - Atlas of the Bahamas

=== Environment of the Bahamas ===
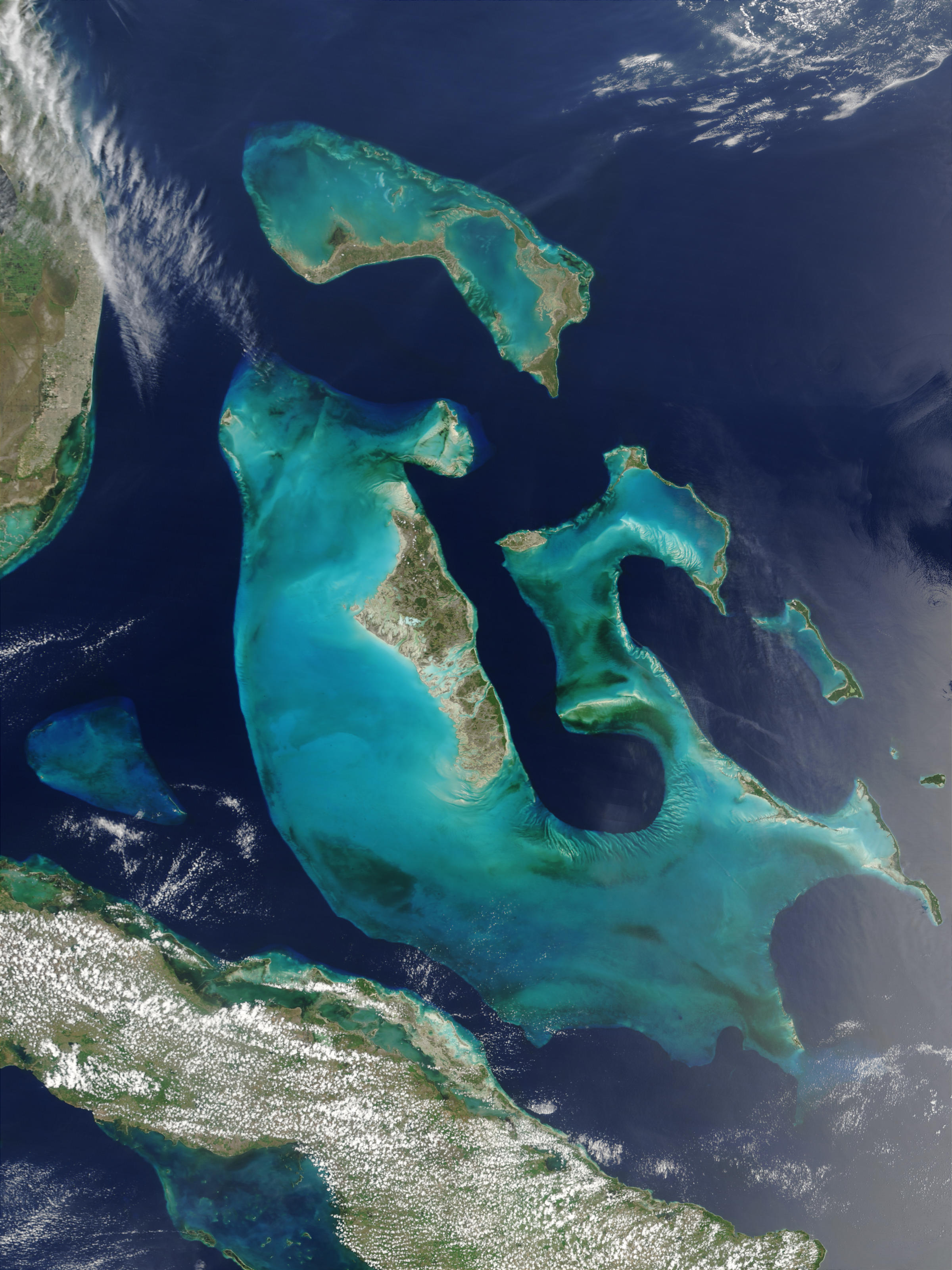
An enlargeable satellite image of the Bahama Islands

- Climate of the Bahamas
- Renewable energy in the Bahamas
- Geology of the Bahamas
- Protected areas of the Bahamas
  - Biosphere reserves in the Bahamas
  - National parks of the Bahamas
- Wildlife of the Bahamas
  - Fauna of the Bahamas
    - Birds of the Bahamas
    - Mammals of the Bahamas

==== Natural geographic features of the Bahamas ====
- Rivers of the Bahamas
- World Heritage Sites in the Bahamas: None

=== Islands of the Bahamas ===
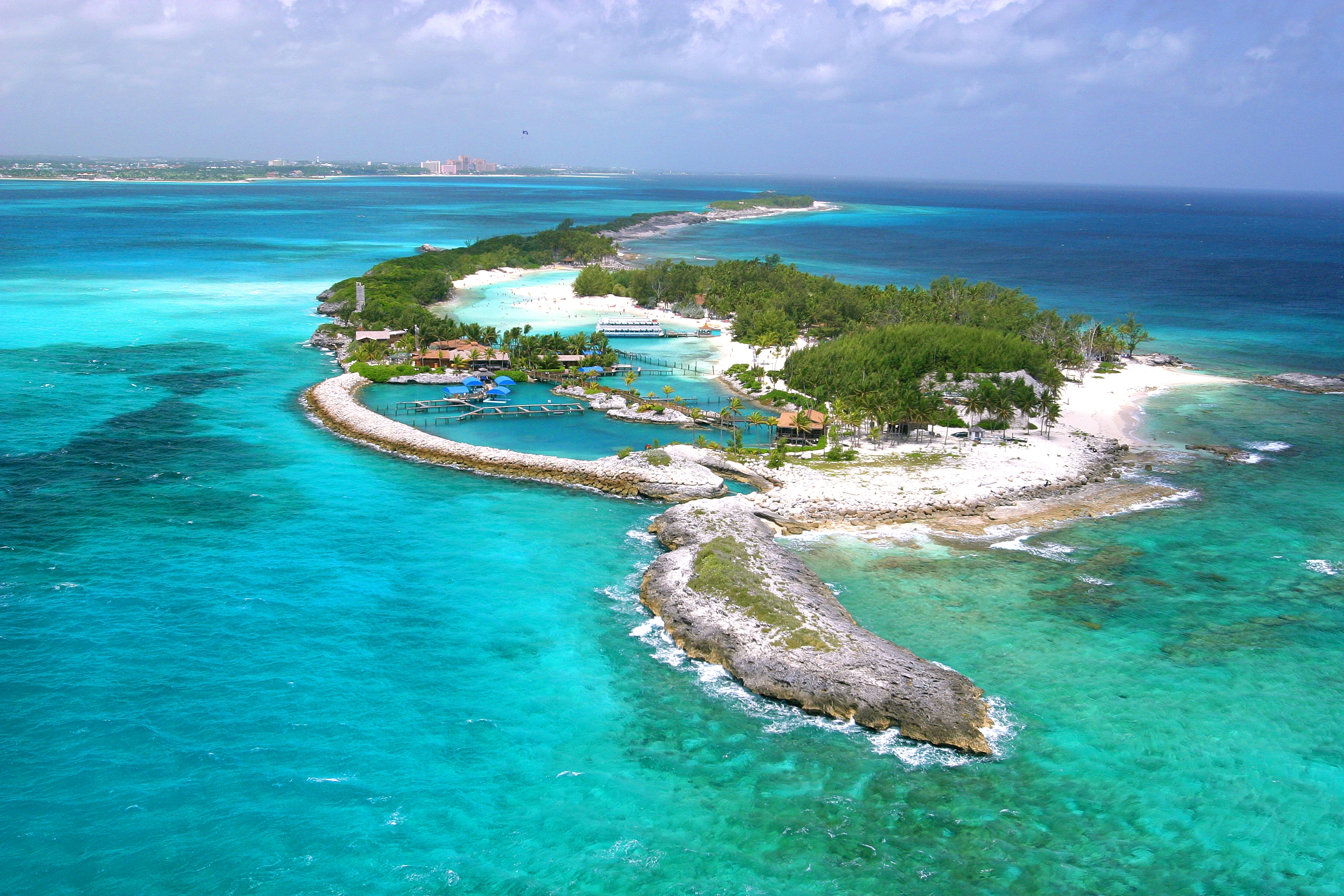
Blue Lagoon Island

List of Islands in the Bahamas

- Abaco
- Acklins
- Acklins and Crooked Islands
- Andros, Bahamas
- Berry Islands
- Bimini
- Castaway Cay
- Cat Island (Bahamas)
- Conception Island
- Crooked Island (Bahamas)
- Egg Island (Bahamas)
- Eleuthera
- Exuma
- Grand Bahama
- Great Guana Cay
- Great Stirrup Cay
- Little San Salvador Island
- Little Stirrup Cay
- Long Island, Bahamas
- Man-O-War Cay
- Mayaguana
- Moore's Island
- New Providence
- Norman's Cay
- Out Islands
- Paradise Island
- Ragged Island
- Rose Island, Bahamas
- Rum Cay
- Samana Cay
- San Salvador Island
- Windermere Island

=== Regions of the Bahamas ===
New Providence Regions of the Bahamas

==== Ecoregions of the Bahamas ====
List of ecoregions in the Bahamas

- Ecoregions in the Bahamas

==== Administrative divisions of the Bahamas ====
Administrative divisions of the Bahamas

- Districts of the Bahamas
  - Municipalities of the Bahamas

===== Districts of the Bahamas =====
Districts of the Bahamas

- Acklins
- Berry Islands
- Bimini
- Black Point (Exuma)
- Cat Island
- Central Abaco
- Central Andros
- Central Eleuthera
- City of Freeport (Grand Bahama)
- Crooked Island
- East Grand Bahama
- Exuma
- Grand Cay (Abaco)
- Harbour Island (Eleuthera)
- Hope Town (Abaco)
- Inagua
- Long Island
- Mangrove Cay (Andros)
- Mayaguana
- Moore's Island (Abaco)
- New Providence
- North Abaco
- North Andros
- North Eleuthera
- Ragged Island
- Rum Cay
- San Salvador
- South Abaco
- South Andros
- South Eleuthera
- Spanish Wells (Eleuthera)
- West Grand Bahama

==== Municipalities of the Bahamas ====
- Cities: List of cities in the Bahamas
  - Capital: Nassau

=== Demography of the Bahamas ===
Demographics of the Bahamas

== Government and politics of the Bahamas ==
- Form of government: parliamentary representative democratic monarchy
- Capital of the Bahamas: Nassau
- Elections in the Bahamas
- Political parties in the Bahamas

=== Branches of the government of the Bahamas ===
Government of the Bahamas

==== Executive branch of the government of the Bahamas ====
- Head of state: King of the Bahamas, Charles III
  - Governor-General of the Bahamas, Cynthia A. Pratt
- Head of government: Prime Minister of the Bahamas, Philip Davis
- Cabinet of the Bahamas

==== Legislative branch of the government of the Bahamas ====
- Parliament of the Bahamas (bicameral) (current session: 14th Bahamian Parliament)
- List of members of the Parliament of the Bahamas
  - Upper house: Senate of the Bahamas
  - Lower house: House of Assembly of the Bahamas

==== Judicial branch of the government of the Bahamas ====
Court system of the Bahamas

- Supreme Court of the Bahamas

=== Foreign relations of the Bahamas ===
Foreign relations of the Bahamas

- Diplomatic missions in the Bahamas
- Diplomatic missions of the Bahamas
- United States-the Bahamas relations

==== International organization membership ====
The Commonwealth of the Bahamas is a member of:

- African, Caribbean, and Pacific Group of States (ACP)
- Agency for the Prohibition of Nuclear Weapons in Latin America and the Caribbean (OPANAL)
- Caribbean Community and Common Market (Caricom)
- Caribbean Development Bank (CDB)
- Commonwealth of Nations
- Food and Agriculture Organization (FAO)
- Group of 77 (G77)
- Inter-American Development Bank (IADB)
- International Bank for Reconstruction and Development (IBRD)
- International Civil Aviation Organization (ICAO)
- International Confederation of Free Trade Unions (ICFTU)
- International Criminal Court (ICCt) (signatory)
- International Criminal Police Organization (Interpol)
- International Development Association (IDA)
- International Federation of Red Cross and Red Crescent Societies (IFRCS)
- International Finance Corporation (IFC)
- International Fund for Agricultural Development (IFAD)
- International Labour Organization (ILO)
- International Maritime Organization (IMO)
- International Mobile Satellite Organization (IMSO)
- International Monetary Fund (IMF)
- International Olympic Committee (IOC)
- International Organization for Migration (IOM)
- International Red Cross and Red Crescent Movement (ICRM)
- International Telecommunication Union (ITU)
- International Telecommunications Satellite Organization (ITSO)
- Latin American Economic System (LAES)
- Multilateral Investment Guarantee Agency (MIGA)
- Nonaligned Movement (NAM)
- Organisation for the Prohibition of Chemical Weapons (OPCW) (signatory)
- Organization of American States (OAS)
- United Nations (UN)
- United Nations Conference on Trade and Development (UNCTAD)
- United Nations Educational, Scientific, and Cultural Organization (UNESCO)
- United Nations Industrial Development Organization (UNIDO)
- Universal Postal Union (UPU)
- World Customs Organization (WCO)
- World Federation of Trade Unions (WFTU)
- World Health Organization (WHO)
- World Intellectual Property Organization (WIPO)
- World Meteorological Organization (WMO)
- World Tourism Organization (UNWTO)
- World Trade Organization (WTO) (observer)

=== Law and order in the Bahamas ===
Law of the Bahamas

- Constitution of the Bahamas
- Crime in the Bahamas
- Human rights in the Bahamas
  - LGBT rights in the Bahamas
  - Freedom of religion in the Bahamas
- Law enforcement in the Bahamas

=== Military of the Bahamas ===
Military of the Bahamas

- Command
  - Commander-in-chief
    - Ministry of National Security of the Bahamas
- Forces
  - Army of the Bahamas
  - Navy of the Bahamas
  - Air Force of the Bahamas
  - Special forces of the Bahamas
- Military history of the Bahamas
- Military ranks of the Bahamas

=== Local government in the Bahamas ===
Local government in the Bahamas

== History of the Bahamas ==
History of the Bahamas

- Battle of Nassau
- Colonial Heads of the Bahamas
- Fresh Creek
- Guanahani
- Kemps Bay
- Nichollstown and Berry Islands
- Postage stamps and postal history of the Bahamas
- San Salvador and Rum Cay

=== Hurricanes in the Bahamas ===
- Nassau Hurricane of 1926
- 1926 Miami Hurricane
- 1928 Okeechobee Hurricane
- 1929 Florida Hurricane
- 1947 Fort Lauderdale Hurricane
- Hurricane Andrew
- Bahamas-Nantucket Hurricane of 1932
- Hurricane Betsy (1956)
- Hurricane Betsy
- Hurricane David
- Hurricane Gracie
- Hurricane Hortense
- Hurricane Inez
- Hurricane Lili (1996)
- Hurricane Floyd
- Hurricane Irene (2011)
- Hurricane Sandy (2012)
- Hurricane Dorian (2019)

== Culture of the Bahamas ==
Culture of the Bahamas

- Architecture of the Bahamas
  - Lighthouses in The Bahamas
- Cuisine of the Bahamas
- Festivals in the Bahamas
- Gambling in the Bahamas
  - Casinos in the Bahamas
  - Atlantis Paradise Island
  - Baha Mar
- Languages of the Bahamas
- Media in the Bahamas
  - List of newspapers in the Bahamas
- National symbols of the Bahamas
  - Coat of arms of the Bahamas
  - Flag of the Bahamas
  - National anthem of the Bahamas: March On, Bahamaland
- People of the Bahamas
- Public holidays in the Bahamas
- Records of the Bahamas
- Religion in the Bahamas
  - Christianity in the Bahamas
    - Catholicism in the Bahamas
      - Roman Catholic Archdiocese of Nassau
  - Hinduism in the Bahamas
  - Islam in the Bahamas
  - Judaism in the Bahamas
  - Sikhism in the Bahamas
- Scouting in the Bahamas
  - The Scout Association of the Bahamas
- World Heritage Sites in the Bahamas: None

=== Art in the Bahamas ===
- Art in the Bahamas
- Cinema of the Bahamas
- Literature of the Bahamas
- Music of the Bahamas
  - Baha Men
  - Eric Gibson
  - Junkanoo
  - Music of The Bahamas (docu-musical)
  - Ripsaw music
- Television in the Bahamas
- Theatre in the Bahamas

=== People of the Bahamas ===
- Milo Butler
- R.E. Cooper, Sr. (Baptist Clergy and Civil Rights Activist)
- Clifford Darling
- Arthur Hailey
- Arthur Dion Hanna
- Viktor Kožený
- Joe Lewis (British businessman)
- Sidney Poitier
- Orville Alton Turnquest

=== Sport in the Bahamas ===
Sports in the Bahamas

- Bahamas at the 2006 Commonwealth Games

==== Bahamas at the Commonwealth Games ====
- Bahamas at the 1958 British Empire and Commonwealth Games
- Bahamas at the 2002 Commonwealth Games
- Bahamas at the 2006 Commonwealth Games

==== Football in the Bahamas ====
- Football in the Bahamas
- Bahamas Football Association
- Bahamas national football team
- Gary White (footballer)

===== Bahamian football clubs =====
- Bahamas Shrimp Wranglers
- Freeport F.C.
- Freeport Jet Wash Jets
- Playtime Tigers
- Quality Superstars
- Town & Country Predators

===== Bahamian football competitions =====
- Grand Bahama Football League
- New Providence Football League

===== Football venues in the Bahamas =====
- Grand Bahama Stadium
- Thomas Robinson Stadium

==== Bahamas at the Olympics ====
- The Bahamas at the Olympics
- Bahamas at the 1956 Summer Olympics
- Bahamas at the 1964 Summer Olympics
- Bahamas at the 1988 Summer Olympics
- Bahamas at the 1992 Summer Olympics
- Bahamas at the 1996 Summer Olympics
- Bahamas at the 2000 Summer Olympics
- Bahamas at the 2004 Summer Olympics

== Economy and infrastructure of the Bahamas ==
Economy of the Bahamas

- Economic rank, by nominal GDP (2007): 132nd (one hundred and thirty second)
- Agriculture in the Bahamas
- Banking in the Bahamas
  - Banknotes of the Bank of Nassau (Bahamas)
  - Central Bank of The Bahamas
  - National Bank of the Bahamas
- Communications in the Bahamas
  - Internet in the Bahamas
    - .bs Internet country code top-level domain for the Bahamas
  - Telephone communications in the Bahamas
    - Area code 242
  - Postal service in the Bahamas
    - Postage stamps and postal history of the Bahamas
      - List of people on stamps of the Bahamas
  - Television in the Bahamas
    - List of television stations in the Bahamas by call sign
- Companies of the Bahamas
  - BaTelCo (Bahamas)
  - Bahamas Electricity Corporation
  - Bahamasair
  - Bahama Hand Prints
- Currency of the Bahamas: Dollar
  - Bahamian pound (historical)
  - ISO 4217: BSD
- Energy in the Bahamas
  - Energy policy of the Bahamas
  - Oil industry in the Bahamas
- Health care in the Bahamas
- Mining in the Bahamas
- Bahamas Stock Exchange
- Trade unions of the Bahamas
  - Bahamas Hotel, Catering and Allied Workers Union
  - Bahamas Taxi Cab Union
  - Commonwealth of the Bahamas Trade Union Congress
  - National Congress of Trade Unions
- Tourism in the Bahamas
  - Visa policy of Bahamas
- Transport in the Bahamas
  - Air transport in the Bahamas
    - Airlines of the Bahamas
      - Bahamasair
      - Western Air
      - Sky Bahamas
      - Pineapple Air
      - Southern Air Charter
      - LeAir
      - Cat Island Air
    - Airports in the Bahamas
      - Exuma International Airport
      - Grand Bahama International Airport
      - Lynden Pindling International Airport
      - San Salvador Airport
  - Rail transport in the Bahamas
  - Roads in the Bahamas
- Water supply and sanitation in the Bahamas

== Education in the Bahamas ==
Education in the Bahamas

- College of the Bahamas
- University of the Bahamas
- Bahamas Technical & Vocational Institute
- Bahamas Agriculture & Marine Science Institute

== Specific Bahamian people ==
List of Bahamians

- Milo Butler
- R.E. Cooper, Sr. (Baptist Clergy and Civil Rights Activist)
- Clifford Darling
- Arthur Hailey
- Arthur Dion Hanna
- Viktor Kožený
- Joe Lewis (British businessman)
- Sidney Poitier
- Orville Alton Turnquest

=== Bahamian musicians ===
- List of Bahamian musicians
- Sebastian Bach
- Baha Men
- Eric Gibson
- Joseph Spence

=== Bahamian politicians ===
- Ivy Dumont
- Earl Hall
- List of governors-general of the Bahamas
- Stafford Sands
- Robert Sweeting
- Brent Symonette

=== Bahamian sportspeople ===
==== Bahamian athletes (track and field) ====
- Christine Amertil
- Chris Brown
- Eldece Clarke-Lewis
- Aaron Cleare
- Dennis Darling
- Pauline Davis-Thompson
- Dominic Demeritte
- Laverne Eve
- Debbie Ferguson
- Savatheda Fynes
- Craig Hepburn
- Troy Kemp
- Troy McIntosh
- Nathaniel McKinney
- Avard Moncur
- Frank Rutherford
- Leevan Sands
- Chandra Sturrup
- Andrae Williams
- Tonique Williams-Darling

==== Bahamian basketball players ====
- Deandre Ayton
- Rick Fox
- Trevor Harvey
- Buddy Hield
- Mychal Thompson

==== Bahamian American football players ====
- Devard Darling
- Alex Smith, son of Ed Smith
- Ed Smith, first Bahamian to play in the NFL

==== Olympic competitors for the Bahamas ====
- Chris Brown
- Dominic Demeritte
- Craig Hepburn
- Troy Kemp
- Troy McIntosh
- Avard Moncur
- Frank Rutherford

==== Bahamian tennis players ====
- Mark Knowles
- Roger Smith (tennis player)

== See also ==
- Bibliography of the Bahamas
- Index of Bahamas-related articles
- List of international rankings
- Member state of the Commonwealth of Nations
- Member state of the United Nations
- Outline of geography
- Outline of North America
