= List of Bahamian musicians =

The following is a list of Bahamian popular musicians who have recorded music or have some public standing:

- Avvy – Inagua, Bahamas recording artist
- Baha Men
- Sebastian Bach – Canadian heavy metal singer, born in Freeport, Bahamas
- Ronnie Butler
- Exuma
- "King" Eric Gibson – calypso music
- Blake Alphonso Higgs – goombay, calypso music
- Johnny Kemp
- Angelique Sabrina
- Iris Stryx
- Joseph Spence
- André Toussaint – Haitian émigré singer/guitarist, performed and recorded in Nassau from early 1950s to 1981
- T-Connection
