= Goombay Kids =

Goombay Kids is a Bahamian children's television series which focuses on educating kids about culture, tradition and climate change.

== History ==
Goombay Kids was premiered in The Bahamas on September 1, 2020. It is created by Stephanie K. Nihon and produced by LFD Productions and StoryGiants. The series has received two awards and two nominations. The show stars Bahamian children, including Keara Jones, Adriana Nihon, Javien Rankine, and Mara McCartney.

== Awards ==
- Award Winner for Best TV Series at The Cannes World Film Festival.
- Award Winner for Best Producer in The Cannes World Film Festival.
- Award Winner in the Vesuvius Film Festival in Italy.
- Award winner for Beyond the Curve Festival in the UK.
