= The Bahamas–Colombia relations =

- Bahamas: Colombia

Diplomatic mission
- Embassy of the Bahamas in Washington D.C. (United States) (Note: Concurrent Embassy.): Embassy of Colombia in Havana (Cuba) (Note: Concurrent Embassy.)

Relations between the Commonwealth of the Bahamas and the Republic of Colombia began on 26 August 1977, four years after the Caribbean country's independence. Although the Bahamas and Colombia do not currently have bilateral agreements, they have a significant commercial weight. Both countries are members of Organization of American States and the Community of Latin American and Caribbean States.

== Significant issues ==
The relations between the Bahamas and Colombia is limited to Colombia's Cooperation Strategy with the Caribbean Basin and the support it provides to the countries in this area.

Two of the issues that have not been discussed bilaterally, but have been discussed in multilateral forums, are:

- Drug trafficking: The Bahamas happens to be an important route for the transport of cocaine to the United States and Europe, this is because the Bahamas has a US military base on its territory. This transit dates back to the drug trafficker Carlos Lehder, who already had a great control of the island country by the 1990s, thanks to bribes, which included the former Bahamian Prime Minister, Lynden Pindling. Another case was that of the alleged Bahamian drug trafficking criminal Dwight Warren Knowles, who was extradited to the United States from Colombia.
- Transit of persons: Colombians who want to enter the United States illegally have used the Bahamas as a stop on their access route.

== Diplomacy ==
Relations between the Bahamas and Colombia are very limited, beyond trade or cooperation. Currently, the two countries have not signed any agreement of any kind despite having more than 35 years of relations. Neither of the two countries has embassies or consulates in the territory of the other, so the concurrent embassy for the Bahamas of Colombia is in Havana, while the concurrent embassy for Colombia is in Washington D.C..

On the other hand, regarding consular relations, the Bahamian consulate in Washington D.C. is in charge of these relations for Colombian citizens, whereas the Colombian consulate in Miami is in charge of consular procedures for Bahamians.

== High-level visits ==
In 2013, the former Vice Minister of Foreign Affairs of Colombia, Mónica Lanzetta, visited the Bahamas to strengthen regional, commercial and cooperation issues.

== Trade ==
Trade between the Bahamas and Colombia is based on exports that Colombia sends to the Caribbean country, since this represents a considerable weight in both economies, since these exports are basically oil, which is why the Bahamas is the main CARICOM trading partner for Colombia. However, the Bahamas is not part of the 1994 treaty signed by the CARICOM countries and Colombia.

In 2022, Colombia exported $206M to Bahamas. The products exported from Colombia to the Bahamas were Refined Petroleum ($162M), Crude Petroleum ($39.2M), and Raw Sugar ($1.5M). Bahamas also exported $17M to Colombia. The products exported from the Bahamas to Colombia included Refined Petroleum ($16.8M), Electric Generating Sets ($220k), and Pesticides ($30.1k)

Trade between the Bahamas and Colombia
Country	Exports ($USD)	Percentage (exports)	Percentage (imports)	Percentage (total)	Products
Bahamas	$39.762.289	0.00055%	0.40%	0.32%	mineral fuels, pharmaceutical products, electrical appliances, inks and paints, plastic and rubber products.
Colombia	$588.974.031	1.00%	0.07%	0.53%	mineral fuels, sugar and confectionery, soaps, leather, medical-surgical furniture, ceramic products.

Source: Trade Map

== See also ==
- Foreign relations of the Bahamas
- Foreign relations of Colombia
