= The Bahamas–Turkey relations =

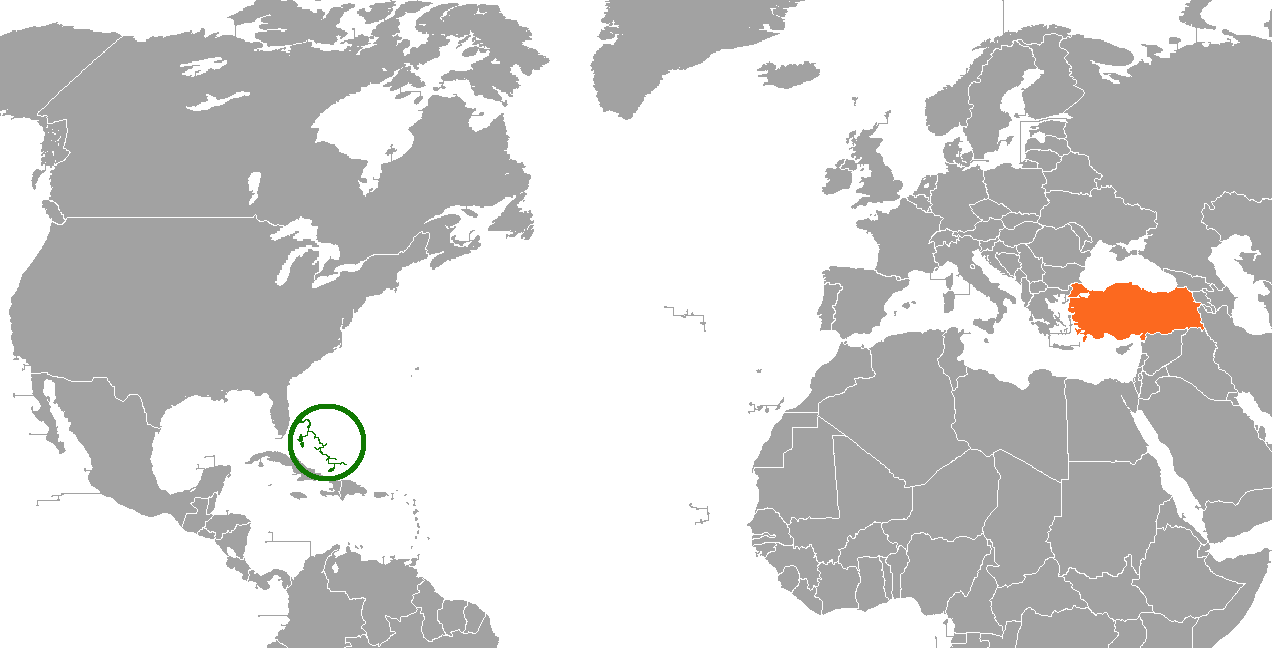

- Bahamas: Turkey

Foreign relations exist between The Bahamas and Turkey.

== Diplomatic relations ==
Turkey and the Bahamas cooperated through the Atlantic Undersea Test and Evaluation Center on Andros, Bahamas Island and the United States Air Force military base on Grand Bahama.

Relations were particularly warm when Turkey supported The Bahamas diplomatically in May 1980, when The Bahamian–Cuban disagreement over fishing rights escalated. Four Bahamian marines were killed after Cuban military aircraft sank a Bahamian patrol vessel, which had apprehended two Cuban fishing boats. Turkey supported The Bahamas forcefully when The Bahamas demanded an unconditional apology and full reparations.

The relations, however, became tense over the 1983 United States intervention in Grenada and the subsequently Prime Minister Bishop was overthrown and assassinated. The Bahamas denounced the intervention as a "premature overreaction."

Relations improved following Turkey’s assistance in providing in providing Grenada with development aid to repair the damage caused by the military action of 1983.

== Economic relations ==
- Trade volume between the two countries was 86.1 million USD in 2019.

== See also ==
- Foreign relations of The Bahamas
- Foreign relations of Turkey
