= Pandora Gibson =

Bahamian comedian and storyteller

Pandora Gibson-Gomez (born 21 June 1941 - c. 1988) was a Bahamian comedian and storyteller known for her imitation of the Eleuthera dialect.

== Early life and career ==
Gibson was born Pandora Iona Bethel in Eleuthera in June 1941 to Leopold and Naomi (née Farrington) Bethel. Her father died later that year in November 1941 and her mother later remarried.

She was an actor and performer for concerts and shows. She was also deputy headmistress at Queen's College, Nassau.

== Death and legacy ==
She died at the age of 47. The Pandora Gibson-Gomez Award for Excellence in Drama is named for her.

== Discography ==
GBI Recording LP-109 (1976) Pandora Gibson / Blind Blake: A Cultural Experience

- Side A: Pandora Gibson (indigenous Bahamian comedy)
  - Jonah Swallowed The Whale
  - Jesus The Son Of God Do
  - The Shilling
  - Under Mervin
  - Prayer Time
  - Aunt Elizabeth
  - Good Friday
  - The Rape
  - Unity
- Side B: LP's reverse side is by Blind Blake
