= List of Bahamians =

Flag of the Bahamas

This is a list of Bahamians, who are identified with The Bahamas through residential, legal, historical, or cultural means, grouped by their area of notability.

== Business people ==
- Pauline Allen-Dean – first woman to become manager of a commercial bank and the first woman to serve as managing director of a commercial bank
- Johnovan Carlos Smith – owner of Limitless Car Rental (luxury & low class vehicle rental)
- Garet 'Tiger' Finlayson OBE – owner of Solomon Mines (luxury retail goods), Burns House and Butler & Sands
- Sherrexcia (Rexy) Rolle – Vice-president of Operations & General Counsel of Western Air

== Entertainers ==
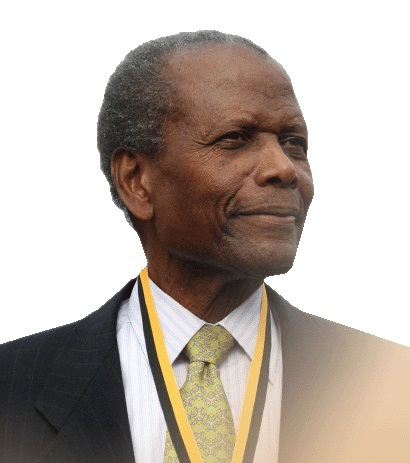
Sidney Poitier

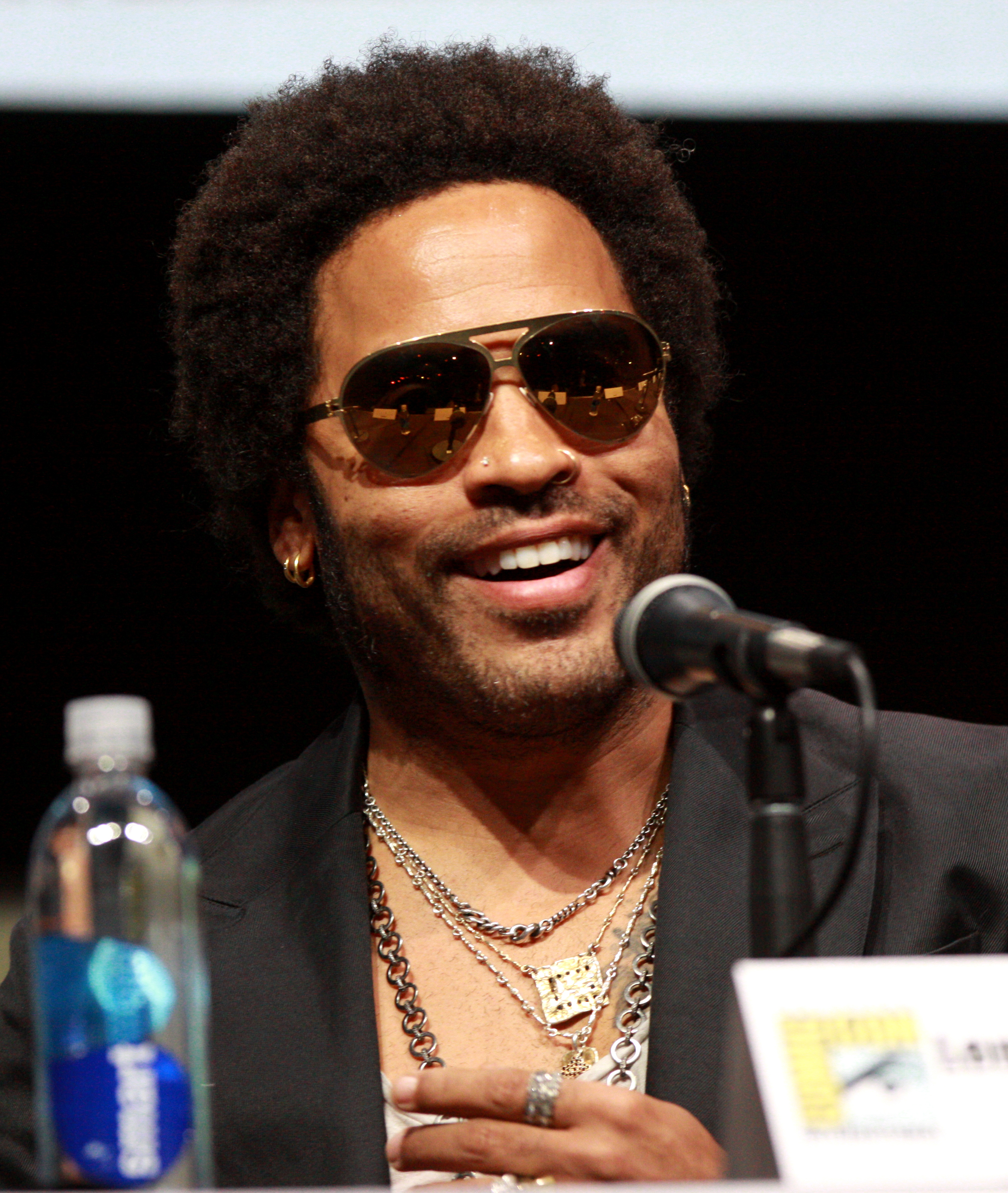
Lenny Kravitz

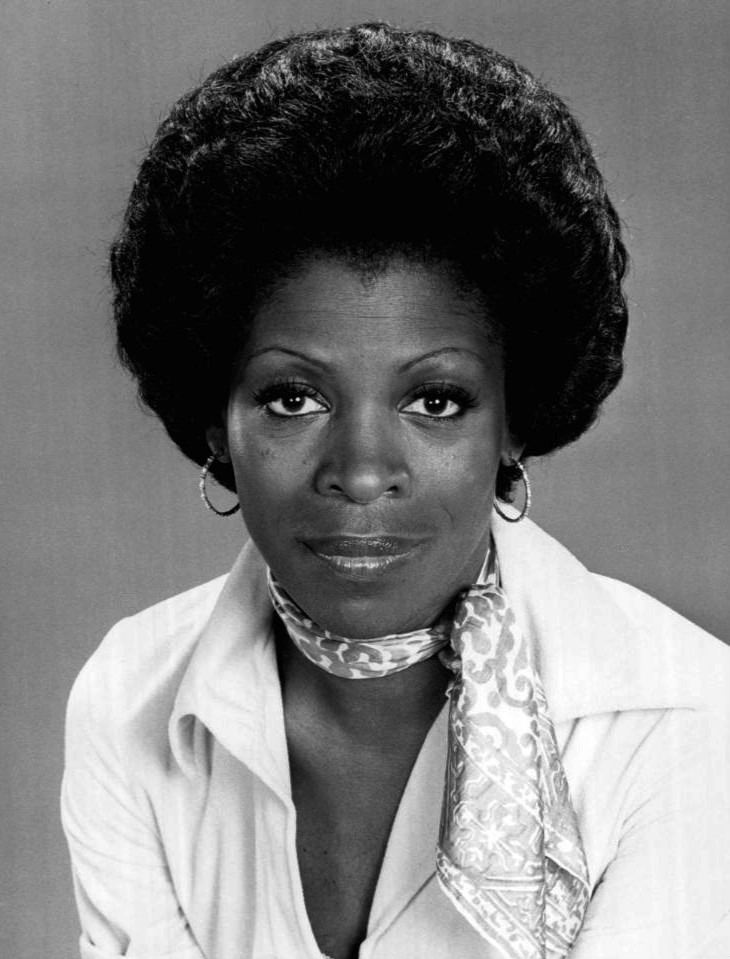
Roxie Roker

- Etta Cameron – jazz singer; based in Denmark; frontrunner of the Danish 1970s and 1980s music scene
- Wendy Coakley-Thompson – writer; author of the novels Back to Life (2004) and What You Won't Do for Love (2005)
- Langston Fishburne – actor, son of Laurence Fishburne
- "King" Eric Gibson – entrepreneur and musician; semi-official Ambassador of Bahamian Goodwill
- Lenny Kravitz – actor, multi-instrumentalist, music arranger, record producer and rock singer-songwriter; son of Roxie Roker
- Zoë Kravitz – actress and musician; daughter of Lenny Kravitz
- Shakara Ledard – super model
- Calvin Lockhart – actor
- Myles Munroe – televangelist
- Tia Mowry – actress
- Tamera Mowry – actress
- Sir Sidney Poitier – actor and diplomat; Ambassador of the Bahamas to Japan
- Roxie Roker – actress; known for role on the television series The Jeffersons
- Esther Rolle – actress; known for role on the television series Good Times
- Angelique Sabrina – teenage actor, dancer and singer-songwriter
- Persia White – actress; known for role on the television series Girlfriends

== Politicians ==
- Perry Christie – became Prime Minister of the Bahamas in 2012
- Frederick Gottlieb – former MP and FNM activist
- Hubert Ingraham – former Prime Minister of the Bahamas
- Sir Lynden Pindling – former Prime Minister of the Bahamas
- Allan Glaisyer Minns – first Black Mayor in Britain
- Brandon Russell – Founder of the Neo-Nazi Atomwaffen Division

== Sportspeople ==
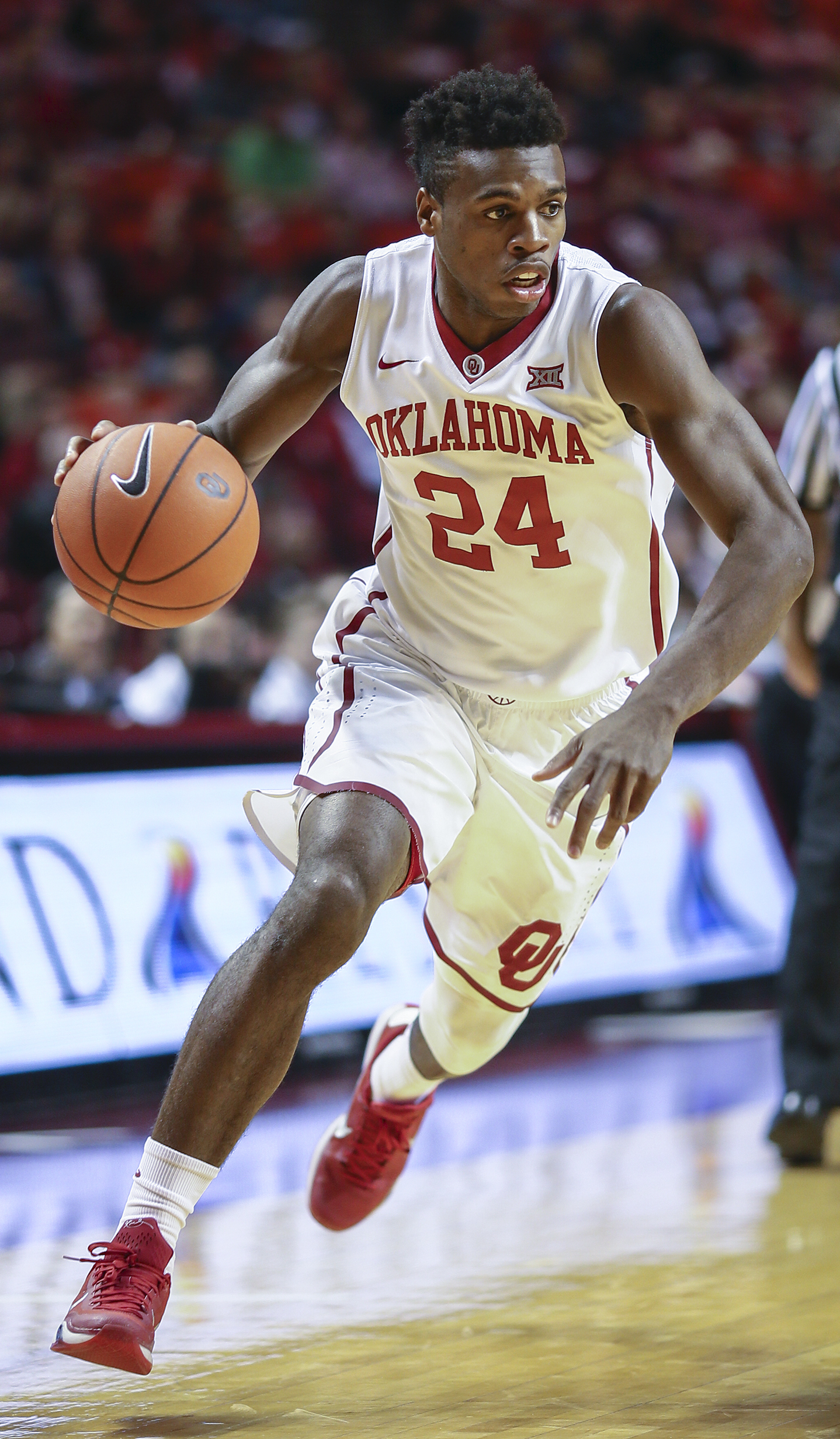
Buddy Hield

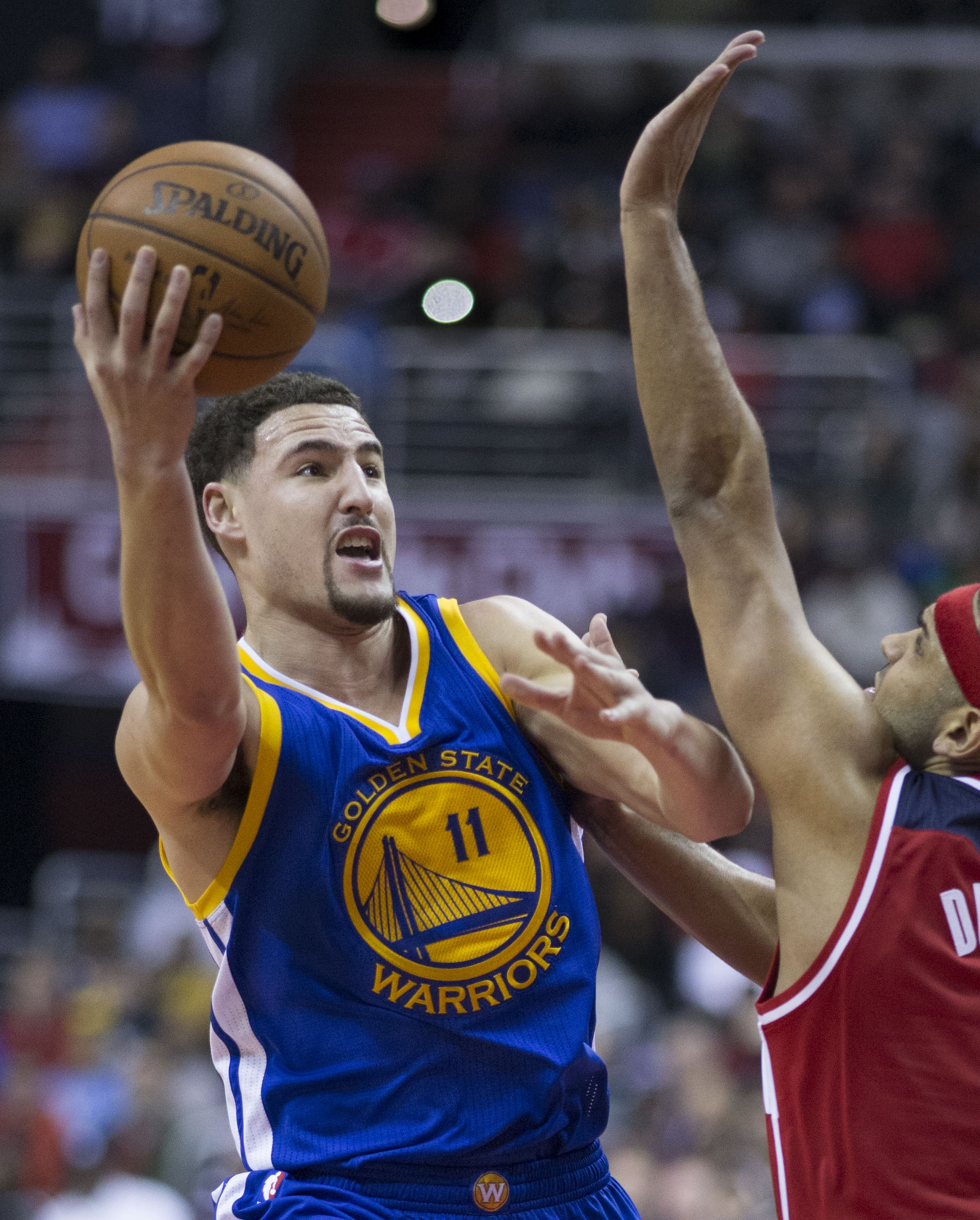
Klay Thompson

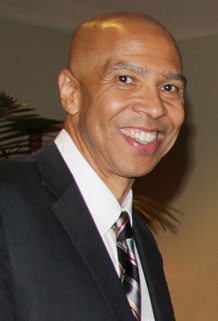
Mychal Thompson

- Deandre Ayton – No.1 overall pick in the 2018 NBA draft, NBA player for Phoenix Suns
- Shaunae Miller – professional sprinter
- Edner Cherry – professional boxer
- André Deveaux – retired professional NHL ice hockey player
- Yves Edwards – mixed martial artist
- Debbie Ferguson-McKenzie – Olympian/Golden Girl and sprint athlete
- Rick Fox – actor and retired professional basketball player; former National Basketball Association player for the Los Angeles Lakers
- Eric Gordon – NBA player
- Steven Gardiner – professional sprinter
- Buddy Hield – NBA player; consensus NCAA Division I player of the year in 2015–16
- Tureano Johnson – boxer
- Evens Julmis – former beach soccer player and FIFA-listed soccer referee
- Mark Knowles – professional tennis player
- Antoan Richardson – Major League baseball player and coach
- Myron Rolle – professional football player; former National Football League player for the Tennessee Titans; Rhodes scholar
- Kimbo Slice – streetfighter turned mixed martial artist
- Ryan Sweeting – professional tennis player
- Klay Thompson – NBA player for the Golden State Warriors
- Mychal Thompson – professional basketball player; former National Basketball Association player for the Portland Trail Blazers and the Los Angeles Lakers; nicknamed "Sweet Bells"
- Tonique Williams-Darling – 2004 Olympic gold medalist (400m), 2005 IAAF World Champion, she split the Golden League – Million Dollar Jackpot ($500,000) by winning eight consecutive 400m events in the championship series; Bahamian government named a major highway the "Tonique Williams-Darling Highway"

== Celebrities and billionaires ==
The Bahamas has one of the largest registers of celebrities who reside permanently or have legal resident status in a country, not of their native birth, hometown, or place of origin. This is primarily due to the favourable financial sector that is tax free (from income, capital gains, inheritance, among others) and is one of the top three worldwide centres in offshore banking. Also, there is a high-quality tourism product, ranking first in the Caribbean and Atlantic region among island destinations. Another is a favorable immigration policy toward wealthy nationals. Those who invest $500,000 in property can be eligible for permanent residential status.

- Nicolas Cage - owns estate residence on Paradise Island and a private island in the Exuma chains.
- Mariah Carey - owns a house on Windermere, a private island connected to Eleuthera, where she married Nick Cannon in 2008.
- Sean "Diddy" Combs
- Sean Connery - owned a property in Lyford Cay; had lived in the Bahamas since the 1990s
- David Copperfield
- Johnny Depp - owns private island
- Rick Fox - Bahamian/Canadian
- Bill Gates
- Michael Jordan
- Helen Singer Kaplan
- Lenny Kravitz
- Joe Lewis (British businessman) - British billionaire (347th richest person on Forbes list of billionaires), owns a property in Lyford Cay
- Terry Manning - American record producer, operator of Compass Point Studios
- Tim McGraw and Faith Hill - own private island
- Shakira Mebarak
- Eddie Murphy
- Daniel Nestor
- Peter Nygard - Canadian billionaire
- Stephen O'Brien - politician
- Mike Oldfield - guitarist/composer (Tubular Bells etc.)
- Sidney Poitier - Bahamian
- Anna Nicole Smith (28 November 1967 – 8 February 2007)
- John Travolta
- Tiger Woods - owns the Albany Estate
- Louis Bacon - billionaire American investor, hedge fund manager, and philanthropist. Owns property in Lyford Cay.

== Other ==
- Diane Claridge - mammalogist

== See also ==
- Bahamian Americans
- List of Bahamian Americans
- Afro-Bahamians
- African diaspora in the Americas
- Afro-Caribbean
- List of people on stamps of the Bahamas
- List of residents of the Bahamas
