= Jamaa' Ahlus Sunnah Bahamas Mosque =

Mosque in Nassau, New Providence, The Bahamas

- Location of the mosque in The Bahamas

Religion
- Affiliation: Islam
- Ecclesiastical or organizational status: Mosque
- Governing body: Jamaat Management Consultancy Limited
- Status: Active

Location
- Location: Nassau, New Providence
- Country: The Bahamas
- Interactive map of Jamaa' Ahlus Sunnah Bahamas Mosque
- Coordinates: 25°01′25.2″N 77°22′17.0″W

Architecture
- Type: Mosque
- Established: 1978

Specifications
- Dome: 3
- Minaret: 1
- Site area: 0.8 ha (2.0 acres)

The Jamaa' Ahlus Sunnah Bahamas Mosque is a mosque in Nassau, New Providence, in The Bahamas.

== Overview ==
The mosque was established in 1978 and is operated by Jamaat Management Consultancy Limited.

The mosque sits on 0.8 hectares (2.0 acres) of land and has three domes with a minaret.

== See also ==
- Lists of mosques in North America
- Islam in the Bahamas
