= Avvy =

- Born: Wendell Mortimer; April 22, 1984 (age 42)
- Origin: The Bahamas
- Genres: Folk music
- Years active: 2005–present
- Website: www.avvyonline.com

Avvy (born April 22, 1984) is a songwriter and performer contributing to the art of Bahamian folk music, Junkanoo and Rake-and-scrape. In 2014 his singles "Dirty Nagua Rake" and "Swing Swing" took top position in the local Bahamian charts.

== Career ==
Avvy Sra active in songwriting and performing in 2005. Early in his career he received accolades for reviving native Bahamian music with innovative storytelling, upbeat rhythms and energetic performances. His father and uncles were also musicians and are cited by Avvy as role models, together with well known musicians including Otis Redding and Michael Jackson.

In 2014 local airline Pineapple Air announced a partnership with Avvy to advertise their service between Nassau and Eleuthera.

== Discography ==
- The Best of "The Best Kept Secret", Volume 2 (August 2007)
  - Tracks: "Intro", "Roach on my Bread", "Wine Grammy Wine", "AvvyOnline", "The Fire", "The Water a.k.a. Jack and Jill", "Ghost Move", "Gimme All You Gat", "Drunk Man Sober Words", "Me and My Crew", "Outro", "Inagua Is Big Thing"
  - Writer: Avvy
  - Producer: Ira Storr and Dillian Mckenzie
- The Best of "The Best Kept Secret", Volume 2 (September 2005)
  - Tracks: "Roach on My Bread", "Ghost Move", "Wine Grammy Wine"
  - Writer: Avvy
  - Producer: Ira Storr and Dillian Mckenzie

== Performances ==
- First Annual Salty Fest (Great Inagua, Bahamas), August 3-August 7, 2006
- Bahamas Independence Concert (Nassau, Bahamas), July 10, 2006
- The Bahamas International Music Fest (Nassau, Bahamas), June 1, 2006
