= Iris Stryx =

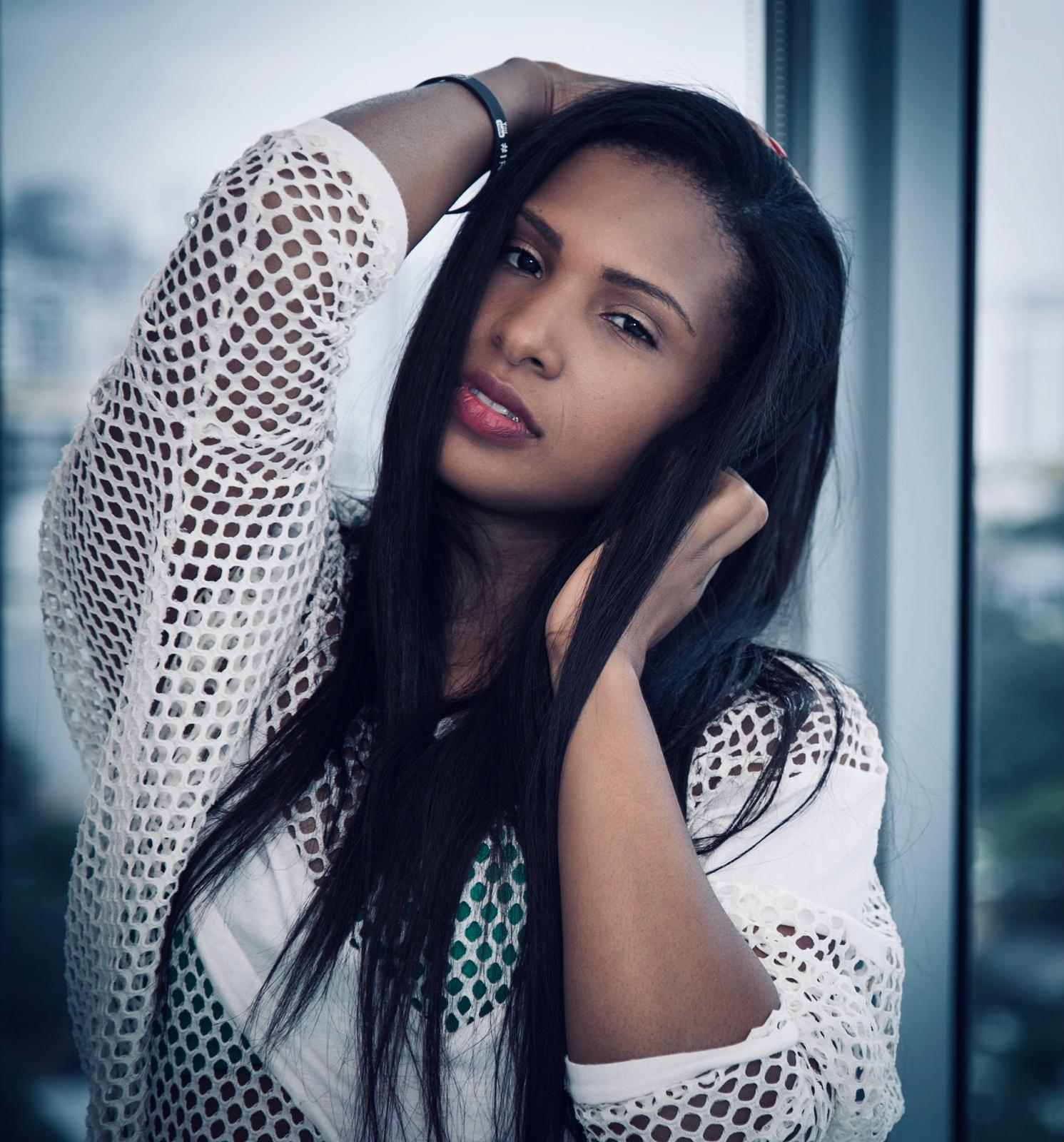
- Iris Stryx

Background information
- Birth name: Iris Saunders
- Born: February 19, 1995 (age 30)
- Origin: Nassau, The Bahamas
- Genres: Soca music; Reggae; Dancehall; Afrobeat
- Years active: 2016–present
- Labels: Waterbear/ Ingrooves/ Virgin Music Group
- Website: www.irisstryx.com

Iris Stryx (born February 19, 1995) is a songwriter and recording artist best known for recording Bahamian calypso and Soca music. In 2016, she released her debut single, "Island Girl".

== Career ==
At an early age, Iris Stryx started her career with piano, composition, and performing arts. Iris attended the University of Miami Film School and during her years in college she began acting and singing. Stryx also toured internationally, while earning radio play and publicity for her Bahamian hit tracks Island Girl and Have a Good Time. Stryx also gained recognition for her reggae / Afrobeat track "Enchanting". "Enchanting" was her return to the industry after giving birth to her daughter, who was featured in the music video.

== Television and radio appearances ==
- Bahamas At Sunrise for single "Island Girls" (2017) ZNS-TV
- Radio segment Co Host for single "Island Girls" (2017) ZNM-FM

== Discography ==
- "Island Girl" (2016)
- "Kings Town" (2018)
- "Have A Good Time" (2019)
- "Enchanting" (2024)
