= Foreign relations of the Bahamas =

The Bahamas has a strong bilateral relationship with the United Kingdom, represented by a High Commissioner in London. The Bahamas also associates closely with other nations of the Caribbean Community (CARICOM).

The Bahamas became a member of the Organization of American States (OAS) in 1956 and the United Nations (UN) in 1973.

== The Bahamas and the Commonwealth of Nations ==
The Bahamas has been an independent Commonwealth realm since 1973, with Charles III as King of the Bahamas. The King is represented locally by the Governor-General of the Bahamas.

== Diplomatic relations ==
List of countries which the Bahamas maintains diplomatic relations with:

#	Country	Date
1	United Kingdom	10 July 1973
2	United States	10 July 1973
3	Barbados	10 July 1973
4	Canada	10 July 1973
5	Germany	10 July 1973
6	Guyana	10 July 1973
7	Jamaica	10 July 1973
8	Belgium	12 December 1973
9	Australia	7 January 1974
10	Mexico	23 January 1974
11	Costa Rica	April 1974
12	Netherlands	28 May 1974
13	Switzerland	5 June 1974
14	Argentina	17 June 1974
15	France	August 1974
16	Israel	24 September 1974
17	Turkey	5 November 1974
18	Cuba	30 November 1974
19	Japan	11 March 1975
20	Iceland	18 March 1975
21	Zambia	19 March 1975
22	Fiji	1 September 1975
23	India	16 October 1975
24	Cyprus	3 April 1975
25	Philippines	3 July 1976
26	Spain	1 December 1976
27	Grenada	1976
28	Venezuela	20 April 1977
29	Indonesia	5 May 1977
30	Haiti	26 August 1977
31	Colombia	26 August 1977
32	Ecuador	27 April 1978
33	Sweden	9 May 1978
34	Brazil	8 September 1978
35	Austria	23 October 1978
36	Morocco	20 December 1978
37	Italy	1978
—	Holy See	27 July 1979
38	Suriname	29 August 1979
39	Saint Lucia	1979
40	Belize	21 September 1981
41	Nigeria	26 October 1982
42	Uruguay	25 November 1982
43	Bolivia	5 August 1983
44	Antigua and Barbuda	1983
45	Trinidad and Tobago	1983
46	Bangladesh	8 February 1985
47	South Korea	8 July 1985
48	Gambia	1985
49	Peru	1985
50	Lesotho	1987
51	Vanuatu	27 January 1988
52	Ivory Coast	27 June 1988
53	Serbia	July 1988
54	Zimbabwe	1989
55	Chile	4 December 1990
56	Panama	1 May 1991
57	North Korea	16 May 1991
58	Denmark	June 1991
59	Dominican Republic	4 September 1991
60	Cameroon	4 October 1991
61	Norway	11 November 1991
62	Nicaragua	3 January 1992
63	Guatemala	30 March 1992
64	El Salvador	6 May 1992
65	Honduras	1992
66	Greece	May 1993
67	Portugal	27 May 1993
68	Maldives	28 September 1993
69	Saint Kitts and Nevis	1993
70	Kuwait	9 March 1994
71	South Africa	28 July 1994
72	Eswatini	1996
73	China	23 May 1997
74	Malaysia	2001
75	Ukraine	27 September 2003
76	Poland	19 November 2003
77	Russia	14 January 2004
78	Slovakia	28 May 2004
79	Slovenia	10 September 2004
80	Malta	20 September 2004
81	Singapore	16 December 2004
82	Latvia	20 January 2005
83	Pakistan	10 February 2005
84	Egypt	11 February 2005
85	Hungary	17 May 2005
86	Czech Republic	6 June 2005
87	Sri Lanka	19 July 2005
88	Lithuania	11 August 2005
89	Mozambique	7 September 2005
90	Ghana	12 September 2005
91	Estonia	20 October 2005
92	Finland	2 December 2005
93	Botswana	May 2006
94	Sierra Leone	7 November 2006
95	San Marino	22 November 2006
96	Ireland	23 April 2007
97	Romania	18 July 2007
98	Uganda	9 August 2007
99	Bulgaria	27 September 2007
100	Luxembourg	28 September 2007
101	Namibia	15 May 2008
—	Sovereign Military Order of Malta	11 November 2008
102	Bahrain	25 September 2010
103	United Arab Emirates	2 May 2011
104	Georgia	13 May 2011
105	Qatar	1 August 2013
106	Kazakhstan	8 December 2014
107	Mongolia	8 July 2016
108	Thailand	21 September 2016
109	Turkmenistan	7 October 2016
110	Brunei	21 November 2016
111	Mauritius	18 January 2017
112	Croatia	31 January 2017
113	Azerbaijan	2 May 2017
114	Montenegro	6 September 2017
115	Armenia	21 September 2017
116	Nepal	7 November 2017
117	Tajikistan	5 December 2017
118	New Zealand	27 June 2019
119	Bosnia and Herzegovina	30 October 2019
120	Andorra	31 October 2019
121	Moldova	15 November 2019
122	Belarus	9 December 2019
123	Rwanda	16 June 2022
124	Tuvalu	23 June 2022
125	Saudi Arabia	23 November 2022
126	Cape Verde	8 December 2022
127	Vietnam	6 January 2023
128	Oman	10 January 2023
129	Kenya	19 January 2024
130	Benin	21 January 2024
131	Solomon Islands	15 March 2024
132	Monaco	17 April 2024
133	Algeria	1 May 2024
134	Uzbekistan	26 September 2024
135	Malawi	22 October 2024
136	Samoa	22 October 2024
137	Seychelles	24 October 2024
138	Togo	24 October 2024
139	Paraguay	17 June 2025
140	Ethiopia	7 September 2025
141	Djibouti	23 September 2025
142	Palau	23 September 2025
143	Kyrgyzstan	25 September 2025
144	Angola	26 September 2025
145	Senegal	26 September 2025
—	Kosovo	19 December 2025
146	Liechtenstein	1 May 2026
147	Laos	30 June 2026
148	Equatorial Guinea	11 July 2026
149	Chad	16 July 2026
150	Comoros	24 September 2026
151	Dominica	Unknown
152	Saint Vincent and the Grenadines	Unknown

== Bilateral relations ==
=== Americas ===
Country	Formal an	Notes
Barbados	10 July 1973	Both countries established diplomatic relations on 10 July 1973.; Both countries are full members of the Association of Caribbean States and the Commonwealth of Nations.; The Commonwealth of the Bahamas is accredited to Barbados through the Ministry of Foreign Affairs in Nassau, and an Honorary Consulate at St. James in Barbados.; Barbados is accredited to the Commonwealth of the Bahamas through the Ministry of Foreign Affairs in Bridgetown, and an Honorary Consulate in New Providence.
Cuba	30 November 1974	See Bahamas–Cuba relations
Haiti	12 August 1977	See Bahamas–Haiti relations
Mexico	24 January 1974	See Bahamas–Mexico relations: Bahamas is accredited to Mexico from its embassy in Washington, D.C., United States.; Mexico is accredited to the Bahamas from its embassy in Kingston, Jamaica and maintains an honorary consulate in Nassau.
United States	10 July 1973	See Bahamas–United States relations The Bahamas and the United States historically have had close economic and commercial relations. The countries share ethnic and cultural ties, especially in education; the Bahamas is home to approximately 30,000 American residents. In addition, there are about 110 U.S.-related businesses in the Bahamas and, in 2005, 87% of the 5 million tourists visiting the Bahamas were American. As a neighbour, the Bahamas and its political stability are especially important to the United States. The U.S. and the Bahamian governments have worked together on reducing crime and addressing migration issues. With the closest island only 45 miles from the coast of Florida, the Bahamas often is used as a gateway for drugs and illegal aliens bound for the United States. The United States and the Bahamas cooperate closely to handle these threats. U.S. assistance and resources have been essential to Bahamian efforts to mitigate the persistent flow of illegal narcotics and migrants through the archipelago. The United States and the Bahamas also actively cooperate on law enforcement, civil aviation, marine research, meteorology, and agricultural issues. The U.S. Navy operates an underwater research facility on Andros Island. The Department of Homeland Security's Bureau of Customs and Border Protection maintains "preclearance" facilities at the airports in Nassau and Freeport. Travelers to the U.S. are interviewed and inspected before departure, allowing faster connection times in the U.S.: Bahamas has an embassy in Washington, D.C., and consulates-general in Atlanta, Miami and New York City.; United States has an embassy in Nassau.

=== Asia ===
Country	Formal an	Notes
China	23 May 1997	See Bahamas–China relations
India	16 October 1975	See Bahamas–India relations: Bahamas is accredited to India from its high commission in New Delhi.; India is accredited to the Bahamas from its high commission in Kingston, Jamaica.
South Korea	8 July 1985	The two countries have good relations.
Turkey	5 November 1974	See Bahamas–Turkey relations: Bahamas does not have an accreditation to Turkey.; Turkey is accredited to the Bahamas from its embassy in Havana, Cuba.; Trade volume between the two countries was 86.1 million USD in 2019.

=== Europe ===
Country	Formal an	Notes
Kosovo	19 December 2025	See The Bahamas–Kosovo relations: The Bahamas recognised Kosovo on 19 December 2025. Both countries established diplomatic relations the same day.
Serbia	July 1988	Both countries have established diplomatic relations in July 1988.; A number of bilateral agreements have been concluded and are in force in both countries.
United Kingdom	10 July 1973	See Bahamas–United Kingdom relations The Bahamas established diplomatic relations with the United Kingdom on 10 July 1973.: The Bahamas maintains a high commission in London.; The United Kingdom is accredited to the Bahamas through its high commission in Nassau.; The UK governed the Bahamas from 1648 to 1973, when the Bahamas achieved full independence. Both countries share common membership of the Caribbean Development Bank, the Commonwealth, the International Criminal Court, and the World Trade Organization, as well as the CARIFORUM–UK Economic Partnership Agreement. Bilaterally the two countries have a Tax Information Exchange Agreement.

== Former countries ==
- Taiwan (ROC) (1989-1997)

== See also ==
- List of diplomatic missions in the Bahamas
- List of diplomatic missions of the Bahamas
- Visa requirements for Bahamian citizens
- North American Union
- North American Free Trade Agreement
- Free Trade Area of the Americas
- Third Border Initiative
- Caribbean Basin Initiative (CBI)
- Caribbean Basin Trade Partnership Act
- Western Hemisphere Travel Initiative
