= The Bahamas–Kosovo relations =

- Bahamas: Kosovo

Bahamas–Kosovo relations are the bilateral relations between the Commonwealth of the Bahamas and the Republic of Kosovo. The Bahamas officially recognised Kosovo as an independent state in 19 December 2025.

== History ==
Kosovo declared its independence from Serbia on 17 February 2008 and was met with mixed reactions from the international community. Initially, the Bahamas did not recognise Kosovo's independence.

In April 2010, Bahamian foreign minister Brent Symonette said "We have considered and continue to consider the situation on the ground on both sides and maintain a status of awaiting the outcome of negotiations between Kosovo and its neighbouring countries before committing support to either of the two countries". On 26 September 2012, the Bahamian foreign minister, Frederick A. Mitchell, said that his state had sympathy for the independence of Kosovo, and that the Bahamas would support the state of Kosovo. In September 2024, Kosovo Foreign minister, Donika Gërvalla-Schwarz, met with Bahamas' foreign minister Frederick Mitchell on the fringes of the United Nations General Assembly. They discussed areas of mutual interest and Gërvalla-Schwarz expressed gratitude for the Bahamas' support of Kosovo's international memberships.

Bahamian prime minister Philip Davis held a bilateral meeting with Kosovo's president Vjosa Osmani on the fringes of the United Nations General Assembly in September 2025 where they discussed deepening cooperation between the two countries.

The Bahamas officially recognised Kosovo as an independent state on 19 December 2025. The two countries also established official diplomatic relations with one another in accordance with international law and the Vienna Convention on Diplomatic Relations of 1961.

== See also ==
- Foreign relations of the Bahamas
- Foreign relations of Kosovo
- International recognition of Kosovo
