= The Bahamas–China relations =

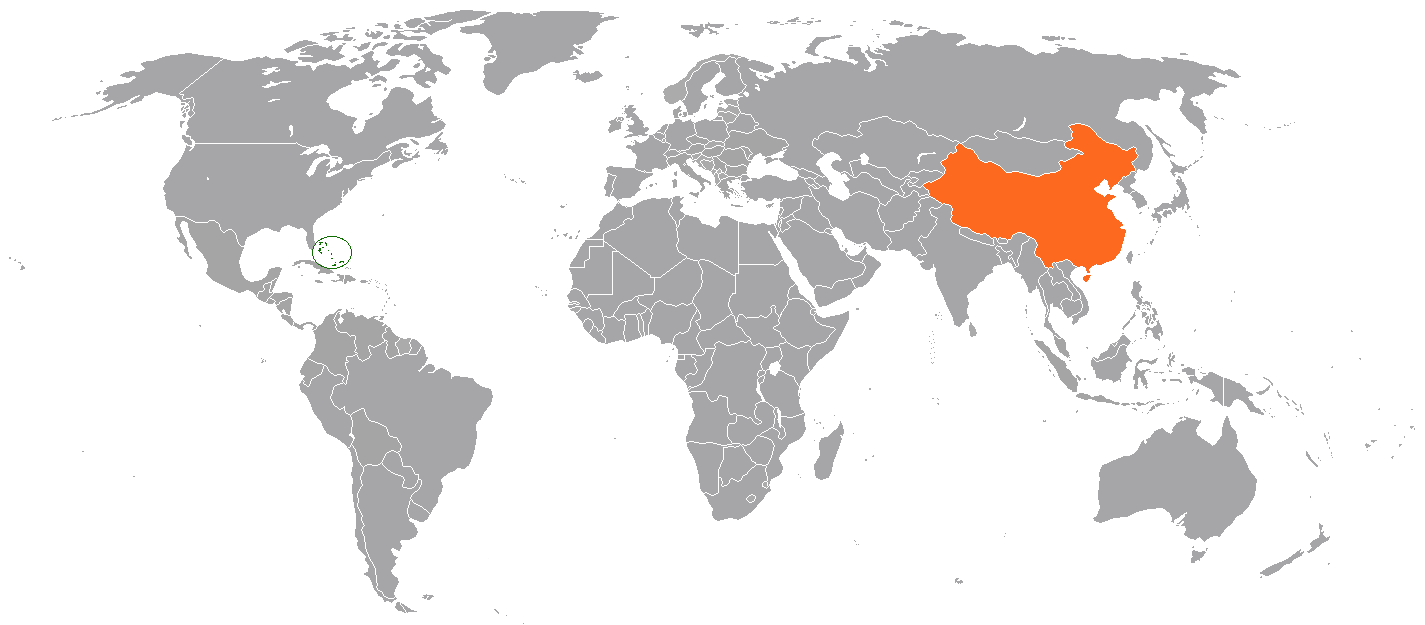

- Bahamas: China

Premier Wen Jiabao meets with Prime Minister Perry Christie in Beijing in 2004

Bilateral relations exist between the People's Republic of China and the Bahamas. Diplomatic relations were established on May 23, 1997, shortly after severing diplomatic relations with Taiwan (ROC) on May 18, 1997. Less than two months later, the Chinese government opened up an embassy in Nassau, on the island of New Providence. The government of The Bahamas has not established an embassy in Beijing, although in 1999 Dr. Arthur Foulkes was appointed the first non-resident ambassador. Prime Minister Hubert Ingraham became the first Bahamian head of government to visit China in 1997.

== Economic relations ==
In 2002 trade volume between the countries totalled some $62.93 million, with China exporting all but $60,000 of that.

== See also ==
- Foreign relations of the Bahamas
- Foreign relations of China
