= List of diplomatic missions in the Bahamas =

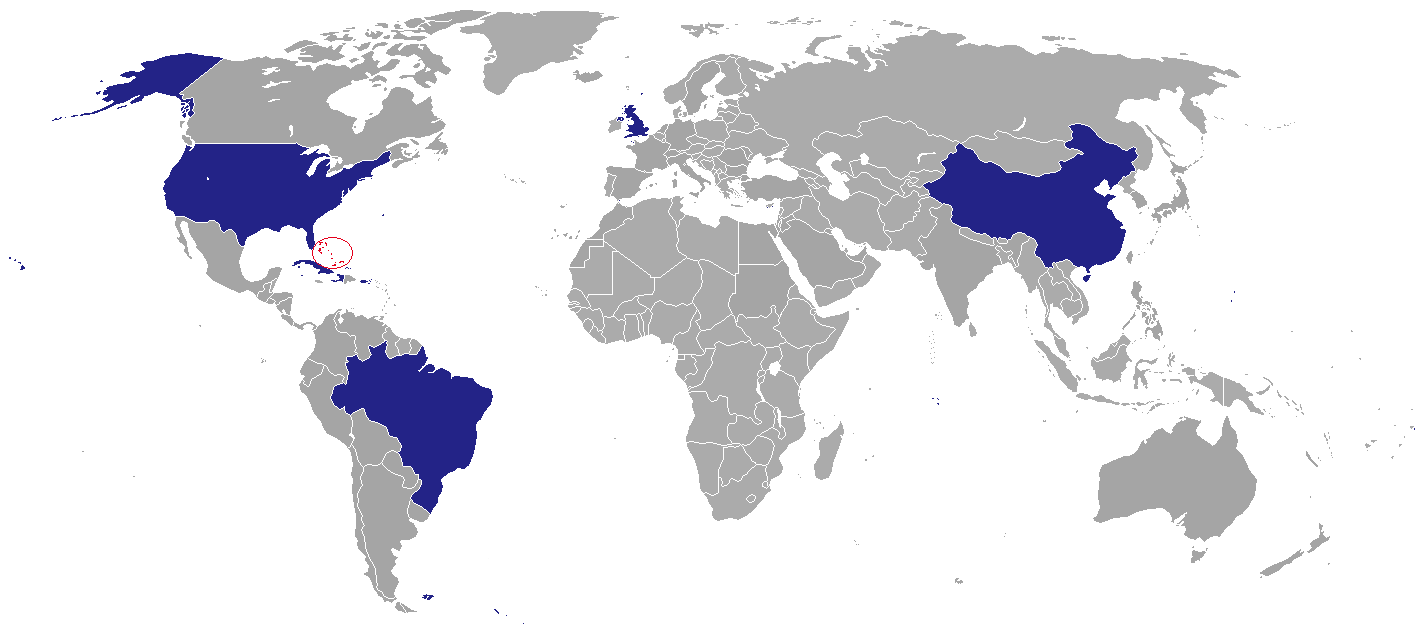
Map of diplomatic missions in the Bahamas

This is a list of diplomatic missions in The Bahamas. At present, the capital city of Nassau hosts seven embassies. Several countries have resident honorary consuls to provide emergency services to their citizens, while others accredit ambassadors from neighbouring countries or their permanent missions to the United Nations in New York City.

== Embassies/High Commissions in Nassau ==
1. Brazil
2. China
3. Cuba
4. Haiti
5. Sovereign Military Order of Malta
6. United Kingdom
7. United States

== Non-resident Embassies/High Commissions ==
Resident in Havana, Cuba

- Algeria
- Czech Republic
- Dominica
- Egypt
- Ghana
- Guinea
- Guatemala
- Indonesia
- Iran
- Iraq
- Kenya
- Laos
- Libya
- Malaysia
- Nigeria
- North Korea
- Palestine
- Slovakia
- Saudi Arabia
- Turkey
- United Arab Emirates
- Yemen
- Zimbabwe

Resident in Kingston, Jamaica

- Argentina
- Canada
- Chile
- Colombia
- European Union
- France
- Germany
- Honduras
- India
- Japan
- Mexico
- Panama
- South Africa
- Spain

Resident in Ottawa, Canada

- Bangladesh
- Denmark
- Finland
- Ireland
- Morocco
- Sweden
- Switzerland
- Thailand
- Uganda

Resident in Washington, D.C., United States of America

- Austria
- Belgium
- Cyprus
- Eswatini
- Greece
- Italy
- Ivory Coast
- Jordan
- Jamaica
- Liberia
- Nepal
- Netherlands
- Nicaragua
- Pakistan
- Philippines
- Poland
- Portugal
- Sierra Leone
- Serbia
- Singapore
- Venezuela

Resident in New York City, United States of America (Note: Accredited missions are the sending countries's permanent missions to the United Nations)

- Bahrain
- Central African Republic
- Costa Rica
- Iceland
- Kuwait
- Latvia
- Lesotho
- Micronesia
- Mali
- Malta
- Maldives
- Nauru
- Russia
- Samoa
- Seychelles
- Slovenia
- Togo
- Turkmenistan
- Tuvalu
- Vanuatu
- Vietnam
- Zambia

Resident in other cities

- Antigua and Barbuda (St. John's)
- Australia (Port-of-Spain)
- Barbados (Bridgetown)
- Grenada (St. George's)
- Guyana (Georgetown)
- Holy See (Port-of-Spain)
- Israel (Mexico City)
- Norway (Oslo)
- Peru (Santo Domingo)
- South Korea (Santo Domingo)
- Republic of China (Taiwan) (Miami)
- Uruguay (Mexico City)

== See also ==
- Foreign relations of the Bahamas
- List of diplomatic missions of the Bahamas
- Visa requirements for Bahamian citizens
