= Catholic Church in the Bahamas =

The Catholic Church in the Bahamas is part of the worldwide Catholic Church, under the spiritual leadership of the Pope in Rome. Columbus landed on one of the islands of the Bahamas in 1492 which he named San Salvador.

== Description ==
The Catholic Church became organized in The Bahamas in the mid-19th century, and in the second part of the century American influence became even more important, so that in 1885 the islands — considered as part of the US diocese of Charleston since 1866 — were formally included in the Archdiocese of New York. This "American connection" lasted until 1931, when the islands were erected into a separate Apostolic Prefecture, which was elevated to the rank of Apostolic Vicariate in 1941.

According to the 1907 Catholic Encyclopedia:

"Though there existed a tradition of ruins of "religious" buildings being still visible in 1803 on Cat Island (probably dating from the temporary Spanish occupation of 1781–83), there is no evidence of any Catholic priest ever having visited the Bahamas until 1845, when a Father Duquesney, on a voyage from Jamaica to Charleston, South Carolina, stayed six weeks at Nassau and held services in a private house. In 1863 Reverend J.W. Cummings of New York, and in 1865 a Reverend T. Byrne each spent a few weeks in Nassau, and conducted services. Beginning with 1866, the Reverend Dr. Nelligan of Charleston made several visits, and the Bahamas was included in the Diocese of Charleston. In 1883 Bishop H.P. Northrop of that diocese paid a short visit. In a letter dated 28 July 1885, he requested the Archbishop of New York to look after the spiritual interests of the Bahamas, and since that date they have been under the jurisdiction of the Archbishop of New York."

"In February, 1885, the Reverend C. G. O'Keeffe of New York, while visiting Nassau, organized the few Catholics, with the result that on 25 August 1885, the cornerstone of the first Catholic Church in the Bahamas was laid by Georgina Ayde-Curran, wife of Surgeon Major Ayde-Curran of the British Army. On 13 February 1887, it was dedicated under the patronage of St. Francis Xavier, by Archbishop M.A. Corrigan of New York. Father O'Keeffe, to whom belongs the honour of establishing the first Catholic Church in the Bahamas, remained in charge until 1889. In October, 1889, Rev. D. P. O'Flynn came to Nassau with four Sisters of Charity from Mount St. Vincent, New York, who opened a free school for non-white children, and a select school. In June, 1890, Reverend D. P. O'Flynn was succeeded by Reverend B. J. Reilly. In February, 1891, Reverend Chrysostom Schreiner, OSB, of St. John's Abbey, Minnesota, took charge of the mission. In 1893 a new mission was opened at Salvador Point, Andros Island, and in 1897, the Sacred Heart mission was opened in the eastern portion of the city of Nassau."

Today, the Archdiocese of Nassau encompasses the islands of the former British colony of the Bahamas. The Archdiocese is the Metropolitan See responsible for the suffragan diocese of Hamilton in Bermuda and the Mission sui iuris of Turks and Caicos, both British overseas territories. The archdiocese is a member of the Antilles Episcopal Conference.

The diocese was originally erected as the Prefecture Apostolic of the Bahama in March 1929, and was subsequently elevated to the Vicariate Apostolic of the Bahama Islands in January 1941, and to a full diocese, as the diocese of Nassau, in June 1960. On June 22, 1999, the diocese was elevated as the Archdiocese of Nassau.

As of 2004, the diocese contains 30 parishes, 15 active diocesan priests, 13 permanent deacons, several religious priests, and 48,000 Catholics. It also has 28 Women Religious. Catholics make up 19% of population.

== See also ==
- Catholic Church by country
- Religion in the Bahamas
