= Geology of the Bahamas =

The geology of the Bahamas has been researched since the mid-19th century. The islands include Aeolian sands and limestone built on the basement rock of the Florida-Bahamas Platform. The islands are used to infer sea levels based on the arrangement of reef deposits.
