= R. E. Cooper Sr. =

- Born: June 1, 1913; George Town, Exuma, The Bahamas
- Died: October 2, 1980 (aged 67); Nassau, The Bahamas

Rev. Dr. Reuben Edward Cooper, M.B.E., (1 June 1913 – 2 October 1980) was a Bahamian religious leader, founding pastor of Mission Baptist Church, and a leading figure in the country's struggle to achieve Black Majority Rule (1967).

Cooper is best known for preaching the sermon at the official Independence festivities when the country obtained independence from the United Kingdom on July 10, 1973.

== Ministry ==
=== Education ===
Cooper was involved in the Salem Union Baptist Church in Nassau before going on to complete his ministerial studies at the American Baptist Theological Seminary (now American Baptist College) in Nashville, Tennessee.

=== Founding of Mission Baptist Church ===
Upon his return to the Bahamas following the completion of his studies, Dr. Cooper founded the Mission Baptist Church in the Grant's Town neighbourhood of Nassau, an impoverished neighborhood that had been originally settled by former slaves.

Cooper joined the Progressive Liberal Party (PLP) and became a close friend of party leader and future prime minister, Sir Lynden Pindling.

=== Establishment of Jordan Prince William ===
Through his work as a Baptist minister, Dr. Cooper facilitated the establishment of the Jordan Memorial School and Prince Williams High School, both of which played a significant role in providing education to black Bahamians prior to the establishment of widespread public schooling in the Bahamas.

=== Memberships ===
Dr. Cooper also served terms as president of the Bahamas Baptist Missionary and Education Convention and the Bahamas Christian Council and was an active participant in the Caribbean Baptist Fellowship and the Baptist World Alliance.

== Notable achievements ==
1940 – Organised The Mission Baptist Church

1943 – Organised the Jordan Memorial Baptist School

1949 – Editor and Publisher of The Baptist Weekly

1964 – Organised the Prince William Baptist High School

1967 – Chaplain of the Senate of the Bahamas

1971 – President of the Bahamas Christian Council

1972 – Principal of The Baptist Bible Institute

1973 – Preached the First Independence Day Sermon to the New Nation

1974 – Chaplain of Her Majesty's Prisons.

== Other reading ==
Jones, Wendall K., ed. The 100 Most Outstanding Bahamians of the 20th Century. Nassau: Jones Communications, 2000.
