= Blake Alphonso Higgs =

Bahamian musician (1915–1986)

- Also known as: Blind Blake
- Born: Blake Alphonso Higgs; 1915; Matthew Town, Inagua, Bahamas
- Origin: Matthew Town, Inagua, Bahamas
- Died: 1986 (aged 70–71)
- Genres: Goombay, calypso
- Instruments: Vocals, banjo

Blake Alphonso Higgs (1915–1986), better known as "Blind Blake", was the best-known performer of goombay and calypso in the Bahamas from the 1930s to the 1960s.

== Biography ==
Higgs was born in 1915 in Matthew Town, Inagua, Bahamas. For much of his career, Blind Blake was based at the Royal Victoria Hotel in Nassau. His wide repertoire included "Love, Love Alone", a song (by Trinidadian calypsonian Caresser) about the abdication of Edward VIII. Blind Blake's version of this calypso was reportedly enjoyed by the former king himself, who, as the Duke of Windsor, served as Governor of the Bahamas during World War II.

Higgs played the banjo and sang, releasing four albums during his tenure at the Royal Victoria Hotel, including one with singer Lou Adams, and several lesser-known albums toward the end of his career. His first four albums were released on the Floridian label Art, including a 10" with Lou Adams.

Although Higgs was never famous in his own right, his music has been covered by various prominent artists, including Dave Van Ronk, James "Stump" Johnson, Pete Seeger, and Lord Mouse and the Kalypso Katz. The Beach Boys adapted their 1952 recording of the Caribbean folk song "John B Sail" and called it "Sloop John B".

His style was a blend of Dixieland jazz, calypso/goombay, and American folk, likely influenced by the Bahamas' proximity to the US. For several decades, he was arguably the most important figure in the Bahamian tourist entertainment industry. One of his most famous works, the medley "Little Nassau/Peas and Rice", written during the US prohibition era, is about the easy access to alcoholic beverages in Nassau, then complaining of the locals' frustration with a diet of peas and rice.

His ballad "Run Come See Jerusalem" is of particular interest as it describes a historical event of the 1929 Bahamas Hurricane and has been covered by many artists in the 1950s–60s folk revival. It can be heard in a vintage recording with Blind Blake leading on YouTube.

== Discography ==
- Blind Blake and the Royal Victoria Hotel "Calypso" Orchestra: A Group of Bahamian Songs (1951)
- Blind Blake and the Royal Victoria Hotel "Calypso" Orchestra: A Second Album of Bahamian Songs (1952)
- Blind Blake and the Royal Victoria Hotel "Calypso" Orchestra: A Third Album of Bahamian Songs (1952)
- Blind Blake and the Royal Victoria Hotel "Calypso" Orchestra: A Fifth Album of Bahamian Songs (1952)
- Lou Adams Plays Bahamiana Calypso featuring vocals by Blind Blake (1954)
- A Cultural Experience (with Pandora Gibson) (1976)
- Blind Blake & The Royal Victoria Hotel Calypsos: Bahamian Songs (2009)
- Bahamas Goombay 1951-1959, a vintage Bahamas music anthology (Frémeaux et Associés, 2011)
- Calypso - The Dance Master Classics 1944–1958
