= Islam in the Bahamas =

The Bahamas is a majority Christian country, with adherents of Islam being a minority. Due to the secular nature of the country's constitution, Muslims are free to proselytize and build places of worship in the country. Adherents of Islam represent less than 1% of the Bahamian population.

== History ==
Some of the early Muslim settlers in the country were brought as slaves from North Africa. In the 1970s, few Bahamian students embraced Islam while studying abroad and returned home to continue practicing.

== Mosques ==
The country houses only one mosque, which is the Jamaa' Ahlus Sunnah Bahamas Mosque located in Nassau.

== Problems ==
With Islam becoming a minority religion (only 0.1% of the population), the country's media outlets refuse to broadcast Islamic programming, and local newspapers are reluctant to cover events related to Islam and Muslims. Muslims still face problems in carrying out their activities.

== See also ==
- Religion in The Bahamas
