= The Bahamas–Mexico relations =

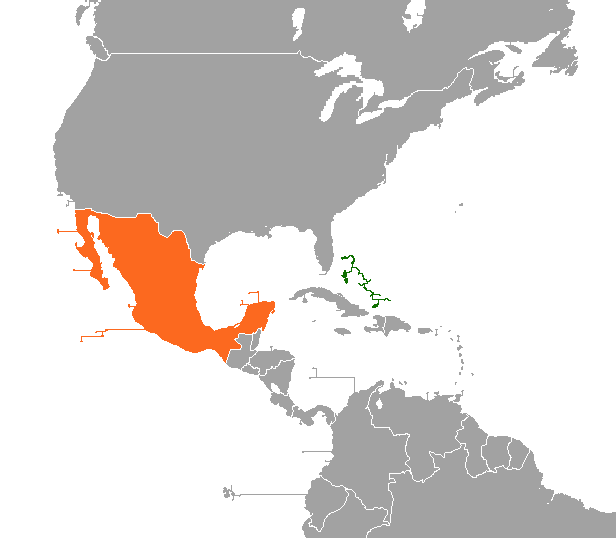

- Bahamas: Mexico

The nations of The Bahamas and Mexico established diplomatic relations in 1974. Both nations are members of the Association of Caribbean States, Community of Latin American and Caribbean States, Organization of American States and the United Nations.

== History ==
The Bahamas and Mexico established diplomatic relations on 24 January 1974. Relations between both nations are limited and have taken place primarily in multilateral forums. In May 1992, Mexican Foreign Minister Fernando Solana paid a visit to The Bahamas to attend the 22nd General Assembly of the Organization of American States. In July 2001, Mexican President Vicente Fox paid a visit to Nassau to attend the Caribbean Community summit. In 2002, Bahamian Prime Minister Hubert Ingraham paid a visit to Mexico to attend the Monterrey Consensus in the Mexican city of Monterrey.

In April 2014, Bahamian Prime Minister Perry Christie paid a visit to Mérida, Mexico to attend the Caribbean Community summit. While in Mexico, Prime Minister Christie met with Mexican President Enrique Peña Nieto and both leaders discussed their desire for the advancement of relations between both nations given its Caribbean connection and ongoing partnership both within the bilateral and multilateral contexts.

In June 2017, Bahamian Foreign Minister Darren Henfield paid a visit to Cancún to attend the 47th General Assembly of the Organization of American States.

In 2024, both nations celebrated 50 years of diplomatic relations.

== High-level visits ==
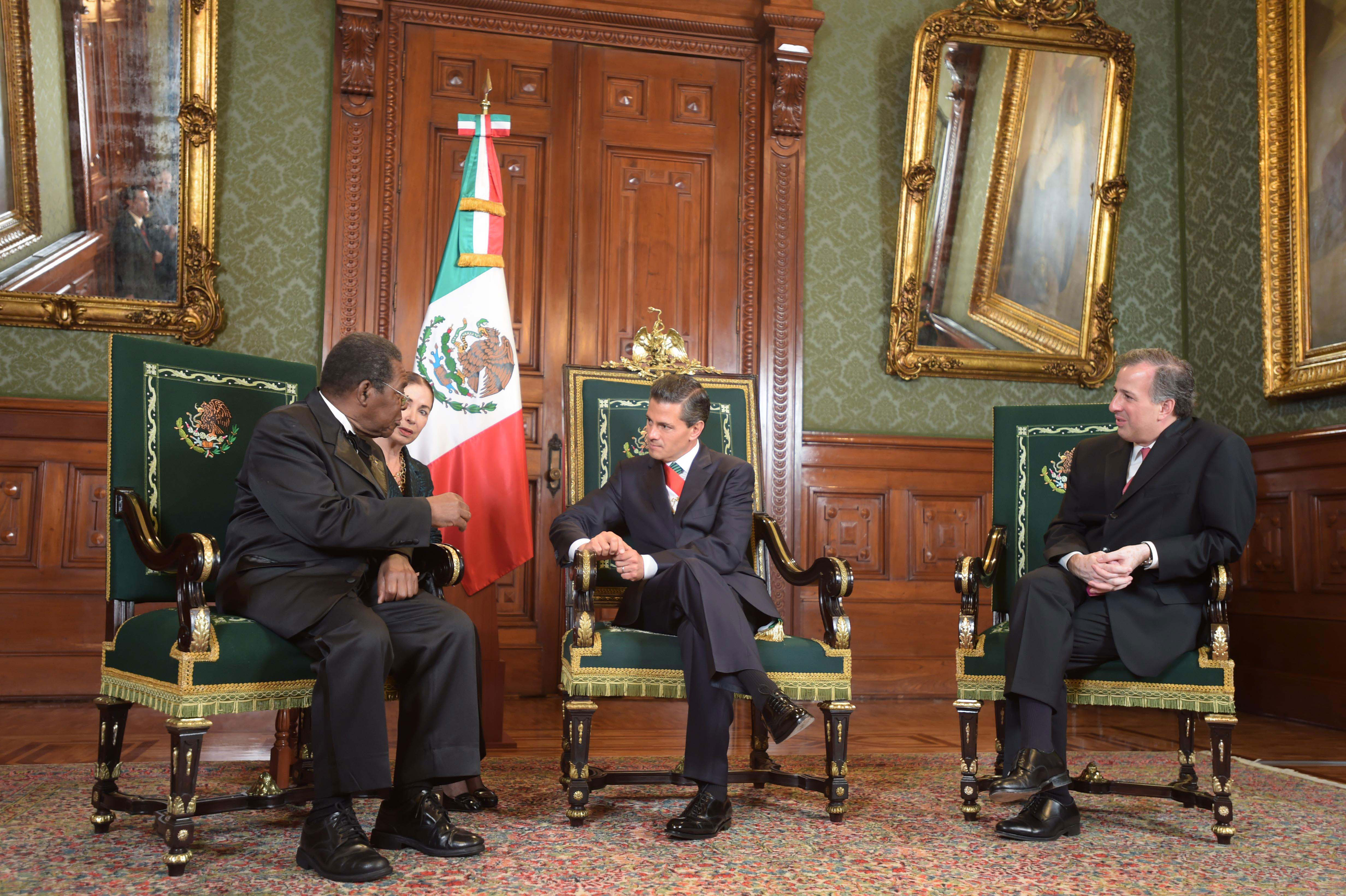
Non-resident Bahamian Ambassador Eugene Glenwood Newry with Mexican President Enrique Peña Nieto in Mexico City; June of 2015.

High-level visits from The Bahamas to Mexico

- Prime Minister Hubert Ingraham (2002)
- Minister of the Environment Earl Deveaux (2010)
- Prime Minister Perry Christie (2014)
- Foreign Minister Darren Henfield (2017)

High-level visits from Mexico to The Bahamas

- Foreign Minister Fernando Solana (1992)
- President Vicente Fox (2001)

== Bilateral agreements ==
Both nations have signed a few bilateral agreements such an Agreement for Scientific and Technical Cooperation (1992); Agreement for Exchange of Information on Tax Matters (2010); and an Agreement on the Elimination of Visas for Ordinary Passport holders (2010). Each year, the Mexican government offers scholarships for nationals of The Bahamas to study postgraduate studies at Mexican higher education institutions.

== Trade ==
In 2023, trade between The Bahamas and Mexico totaled US$53 million. The Bahamas main exports to Mexico include: oil and scrap metal. Mexico's main exports to The Bahamas include: motor vehicles, alcohol, refrigerators, cement and chemical based products. Mexican multinational company Cemex operates in The Bahamas.

== Diplomatic missions ==
- The Bahamas is accredited to Mexico from its embassy in Washington, D.C., United States.
- Mexico is accredited to The Bahamas from its embassy in Kingston, Jamaica and maintains an honorary consulate in Nassau.
