= Religion in the Bahamas =

Religion in the Bahamas (Pew Research Center 2020)
1. Christianity (97.6%)
2. Unaffiliated (1.90%)
3. Other religions (0.50%)

Religion in the Bahamas is dominated by various Christian denominations and reflects the country's diversity.

There is no state religion in the Bahamas, and there is generally free practice of religious beliefs; since the English colonization, most Bahamians adhere to diverse Protestant denominations with Baptist churches/Evangelicals, Pentecostalism, Adventism and Methodism being at the forefront.

== Demographics ==
According to the last census in 2010, over 80% of the population identified as Christian; major Protestant denominations included Baptists (35%), Anglicans (14%), Pentecostals (9%), Seventh-day Adventists (4%), and Methodists (4%), while 12% were Catholic.

Other religious groups included Greek Orthodox, Jewish, Baháʼí, Jehovah's Witness, Muslim, Rastafarian and Obeah (a form of African shamanism). In the past, members of the small resident Guyanese and Indian populations practiced Hinduism and other South Asian religions.

In 2010, 90% of the population of the Bahamas professed a religion, and anecdotal evidence suggests that most attend services regularly.

In the past, although many unaffiliated Protestant congregations were almost exclusively black, most mainstream churches are integrated racially.

== Religious freedom ==
The constitution of the Bahamas provides for the freedom of religion and prohibits discrimination based on belief. The country has no state religion, although the preamble to its constitution mentions "Christian values".

Obeah is illegal in the Bahamas, punishable by a jail sentence. This law, however, is traditionally unenforced. Similarly, laws prohibiting the publication of blasphemy (with exceptions for opinions "expressed in good faith and in decent language") are also unenforced.

In 2022, there were reports of difficulties for Rastafarians regarding use of marijuana for religious reasons and traditional hairstyles in schools.

== See also ==
- Diocese of the Bahamas and the Turks and Caicos Islands
- Islam in Bahamas
- Hinduism in the West Indies
- Religion in Jamaica
- Religion in Trinidad and Tobago
- Roman Catholicism in the Bahamas
