= .bs =

Top-level Internet domain for the Bahamas

- Introduced: 3 September 1991
- TLD type: Country code top-level domain
- Status: Active
- Registry: BSNIC
- Sponsor: University of the Bahamas
- Intended use: Entities connected with The Bahamas
- Actual use: Gets some use in the Bahamas
- Registration restrictions: None, except in a few of the third-level registrations such as .gov.bs
- Structure: Registrations are taken directly at the second level, or at the third level beneath various second-level labels
- Documents: Registration terms
- Dispute policies: UDRP
- DNSSEC: No
- Registry website: BSNIC

.bs is the Internet country code top-level domain (ccTLD) for the Bahamas administered by the University of the Bahamas.

== Second level domains ==
There are six Second Level Domains:

| Second level domain | Intended purpose |
|---|---|
| .com.bs | Commercial entities |
| .net.bs | Network providers |
| .org.bs | Non-commercial organizations |
| .edu.bs | Educational institutions |
| .gov.bs | Government ministries and agencies |
| we.bs | Can be registered by anyone |

The .gov.bs domain name space is managed by DIT at the Bahamas Ministry of Finance.

== See also ==
- Internet in the Bahamas
