= ZNM-FM =

Radio station

- Nassau, Bahamas; Bahamas
- Broadcast area: New Providence, Bahamas
- Frequency: 94.9 MHz
- Branding: More 94FM

Programming
- Format: Urban AC, Mainstream urban

History
- Call sign meaning: ZN (former ITU prefix under United Kingdom rule) More

Technical information
- ERP: 5,000 watts
- HAAT: 35 meters (115 ft)
- Transmitter coordinates: 25°2′44″N 77°19′5″W

Links
- Webcast: http://www.more94fm.com/player/
- Website: http://www.more94fm.com/

ZNM-FM, more popularly known as More 94 FM is an urban adult contemporary/mainstream urban radio station broadcasting in Nassau, Bahamas.
