= Wendy Coakley-Thompson =

American novelist

- Born: Wendy Cecille Thompson; December 27, 1966 (age 59); New York City, U.S.
- Education: Montclair State University (BA); William Paterson College (MA); Syracuse University (PhD)
- Occupation: Author
- Website: Official Site

Wendy Coakley-Thompson (nee, Wendy Cecille Thompson; born December 27, 1966), is a mainstream fiction author. Coakley-Thompson's work is part of emerging millennial contemporary African-American literature. Coakley-Thompson's fiction addresses themes and issues concerning interracial relationships, race, racial identity, and people of mixed race.

== Early life and education ==
Wendy Cecille Thompson was born on December 27, 1966, in Brooklyn. Her Bahamian parents were Frederick Oliver Wendell Thompson (1929–1982) and Marina Thompson (née Coakley). Coakley-Thompson was raised in Nassau, Bahamas. She lived in Montclair, New Jersey, for over a decade.

Coakley-Thompson has a BA in Speech and Theater (Broadcasting) from Montclair State College in Upper Montclair, New Jersey; an MA in Communication Arts from William Paterson College in Wayne, New Jersey; and a PhD in Education (Instructional Design, Development, and Evaluation) from Syracuse University in Syracuse, New York. Coakley-Thompson's dissertation, written in 1999 in partial fulfilment of the PhD degree is entitled: The Use of Popular Media in Multicultural Education: Stressing Implications for the Black/Non-Black biracial student.

== Career ==
In December 2006, Rainy Friday Films, a Chicago-based independent production company, optioned the film rights to What You Won't Do for Love, Coakley-Thompson's second novel. From February 2007 until October 2007, Coakley-Thompson co-hosted The Book Squad on WMET1160 with author Karyn Langhorne.

== Publications ==
- Back to Life (2004)
- What You Won't Do for Love (2005)
- Triptych (2008)
- Writing While Black (2012)

== See also ==
- Bahamian American
- List of romantic novelists
- List of novelists from the United States
