= The Bahamas–India relations =

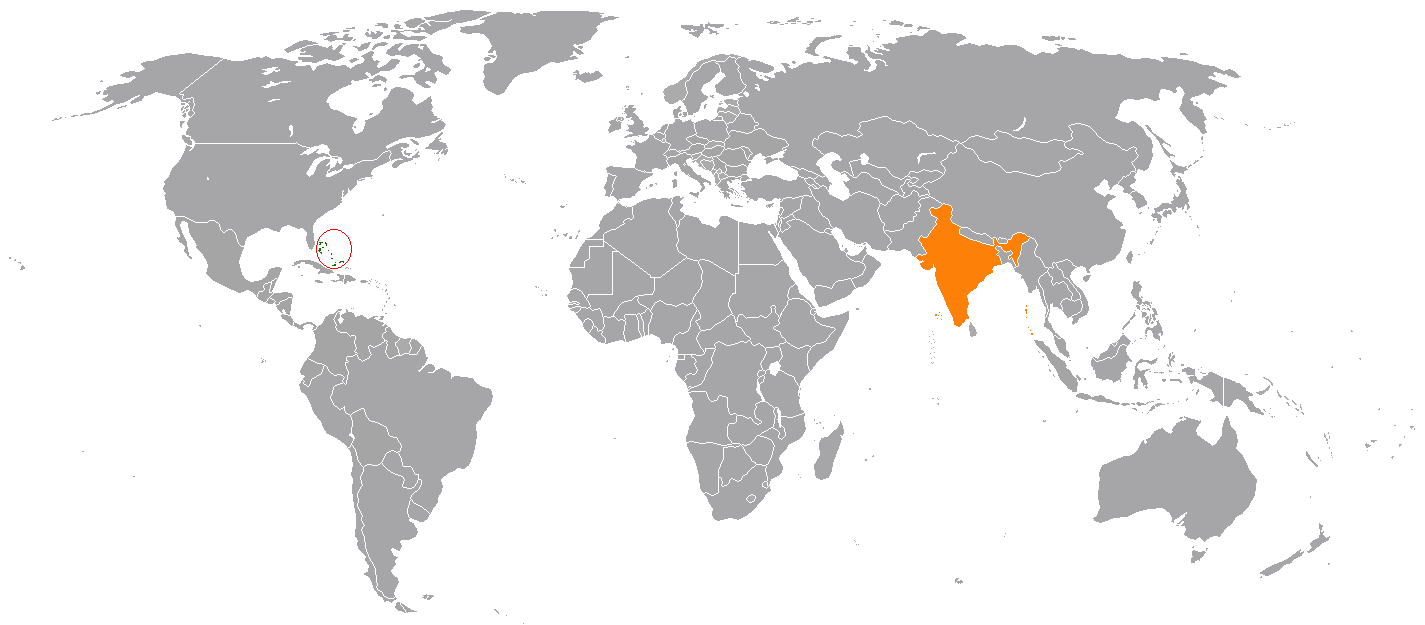

- Bahamas: India

The Bahamas–India relations refer to bilateral relations between The Bahamas and India. The Bahamas maintains an Honorary Consulate in New Delhi. The High Commission of India in Kingston, Jamaica concurrently accredited to The Bahamas. India does not have a resident diplomatic mission in The Bahamas.

== History ==
The Bahamas and India have always supported each other at various international and multilateral fora such as the United Nations. The Bahamas supported Comprehensive Convention on International Terrorism proposed by India at the UN, and also supported India's candidature for a Non-Permanent Seat on the UN Security Council for the year 2011–12. The country also supports India's candidature for a permanent seat in the UN Security Council. The two countries have often voted for each other's candidates at organizations such as the UN Security Council, the UN Human Rights Council, the UNHRC Committee on the Elimination of Discrimination against Women, the Commonwealth, the International Law Commission, and the International Maritime Organisation. The Bahamas was an early supporter of the candidature of Indian diplomat Kamalesh Sharma for Commonwealth Secretary-General. Bahamian Foreign Minister Frederick Mitchell stated that Sharma gave a lot of support to small island developing states like The Bahamas.

Prime Minister Rajiv Gandhi visited Nassau in October 1985 to attend the CHOGM Summit. The Secretary (West) of the Ministry of External Affairs visited The Bahamas in September 2005 to hold Foreign Office Consultations. Bahamas Minister of Foreign Affairs and Public Service Frederick Mitchell, accompanied by a business delegation, visited India in January 2006. During the visit, an omnibus "Agreement on Bilateral Cooperation" between the two Governments, and an "Agreement on the Establishment of Joint Business Council between FICCI and The Bahamas Chamber of Commerce" were signed. Mitchell visited the country again in March 2006, accompanying the wife of then Prime Minister Perry Christie on her private visit to India. Minister of State (PMO) Prithviraj Chauhan visited The Bahamas in May 2006 to participate in the Commonwealth Youth Ministers’ Conference.

The High Commission of India in Kingston, Jamaica was concurrently accredited to The Bahamas in August 2004. The Bahamas appointed an Honorary Consul in New Delhi in October 2006. Prime Ministers Hubert A. Ingraham and Manmohan Singh held a bilateral meeting on the sidelines of the CHOGM Summit in Kampala in November 2007. During the meeting, Ingraham requested India's cooperation in solar energy, technical and vocational education, specialists, teachers, and IT assistance.

Foreign Minister Mitchell visited India a decade later in April 2016. During the visit, he sought India's support for several Bahamian candidates in elections to multilateral organizations, and also pledged his country's support for Indian candidates in elections to multilateral organizations.

== Trade ==
The Bahamas was India's largest trade partner in the Caribbean, and fourth largest trade partner in the Latin America and the Caribbean region in 2011–12. The Financial Express senior correspondent for Latin America, Huma Siddiqui, wrote that the high value of bilateral trade is most likely the result of financial transactions passing through The Bahamas offshore banking system rather than merchandise trade. Bilateral trade between The Bahamas and India totaled US$2,247.01 million in 2011–12. Indian exports to The Bahamas stood at $2,243.52 million and imports were $3.49 million. India's major exports to The Bahamas are IT products/services, pharmaceuticals, manufactured goods and auto parts.

As a result of a small Indian community in The Bahamas and lack of direct connectivity with India, the local business community in the country often imports goods of Indian origin from the United States and the United Kingdom due to closer proximity and more established and economical shipping arrangements.

The two countries signed a Bilateral Tax Information Exchange Agreement (TIEA) on 11 February 2011. The agreement enables the two countries to exchange information relating to civil and criminal investigations.

Campbell Shipping is a shipping company registered in The Bahamas, and with its headquarters in Mumbai. The State Bank of India and the Bank of Baroda maintain branches in Nassau.

Documents released in the Panama Papers in September 2016, included the names of 475 Indian people, trusts and companies registered in The Bahamas. The names included Indian corporate personalities from industries such as mines and metals, electronics, real estate, media and entertainment.

== Cultural relations ==
As of January 2015, around 300 Indians reside in The Bahamas. The community is mostly made up of professionals, and are well integrated in Bahamian society.

Around 1,455 Indian tourists visited The Bahamas in 2015.

== Foreign aid ==
India has provided assistance to The Bahamas in IT and diplomatic training. India donated $50,000 worth of medicines to The Bahamas in the aftermath of damage caused by Hurricane Ivan in September 2004.

Citizens of The Bahamas are eligible for scholarships under the Indian Technical and Economic Cooperation Programme. Bahamian diplomats have attended the Professional Course for Foreign Diplomats (PCFD) organised by the Foreign Service Institute of the Ministry of External Affairs.
