= The Bahamas–Cuba relations =

- Bahamas: Cuba

The Bahamas–Cuba relations are diplomatic and bilateral relations between the Commonwealth of The Bahamas and the Republic of Cuba. Both nations are members of the Association of Caribbean States, Community of Latin American and Caribbean States and the United Nations.

The Bahamas has an embassy in Havana and Cuba has an embassy in Nassau.

Both nations share a maritime border.

== See also ==
- Foreign relations of The Bahamas
- Foreign relations of Cuba
