= List of diplomatic missions of the Bahamas =

This is a list of diplomatic missions of the Bahamas. The Bahamas has a very small number of diplomatic missions, as listed below (excluding honorary consulates).

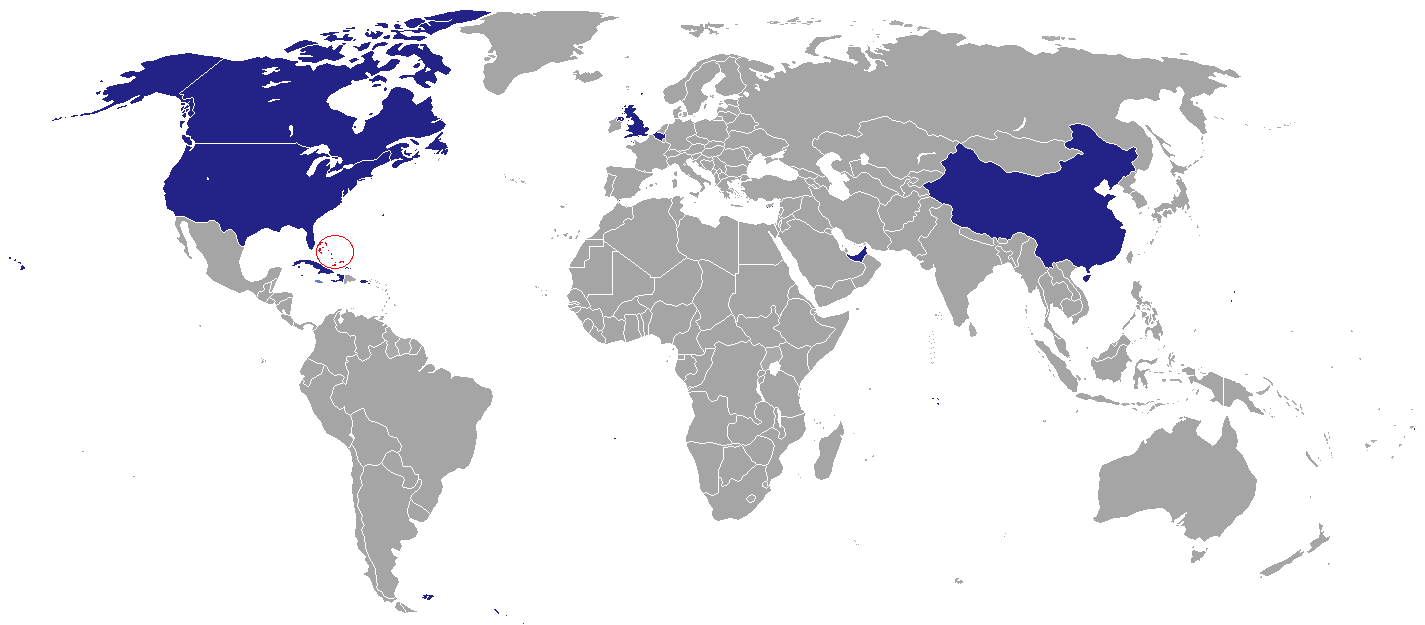
Map of diplomatic missions of the Bahamas

== Current missions ==
=== Americas ===
Host country	Host city	Mission	Concurrent accreditation	Ref.
Canada	Ottawa	High Commission		
Canada	Toronto	Consulate-General		
Cuba	Havana	Embassy		
Haiti	Port-au-Prince	Embassy		
Jamaica	Kingston	Consulate-General	Multilateral Organizations: International Seabed Authority	
United States	Washington, D.C.	Embassy	Countries: Colombia; International Organizations: Organization of American States	
United States	Atlanta	Consulate-General	Countries: Colombia; International Organizations: Organization of American States	
United States	Los Angeles	Consulate-General	Countries: Colombia; International Organizations: Organization of American States	
United States	Miami	Consulate-General	Countries: Colombia; International Organizations: Organization of American States	
United States	New York City	Consulate-General	Countries: Colombia; International Organizations: Organization of American States	

=== Asia ===
Host country	Host city	Mission	Concurrent accreditation	Ref.
China	Beijing	Embassy	Countries: Indonesia; Malaysia	
United Arab Emirates	Abu Dhabi	Embassy		

=== Europe ===
Host country	Host city	Mission	Concurrent accreditation	Ref.
Belgium	Brussels	Embassy	Multilateral Organizations: European Union	
United Kingdom	London	High Commission	Countries: Austria; Malta; Multilateral Organizations: International Maritime Organization	

=== Multilateral organizations ===
Organization	Host city	Host country	Mission	Concurrent accreditation	Ref.
United Nations	Geneva	Switzerland	Permanent Mission		
United Nations	New York City	United States	Permanent Mission	Countries: Guatemala; Multilateral Organizations: Organisation for the Prohibition of Chemical Weapons	

== Gallery ==
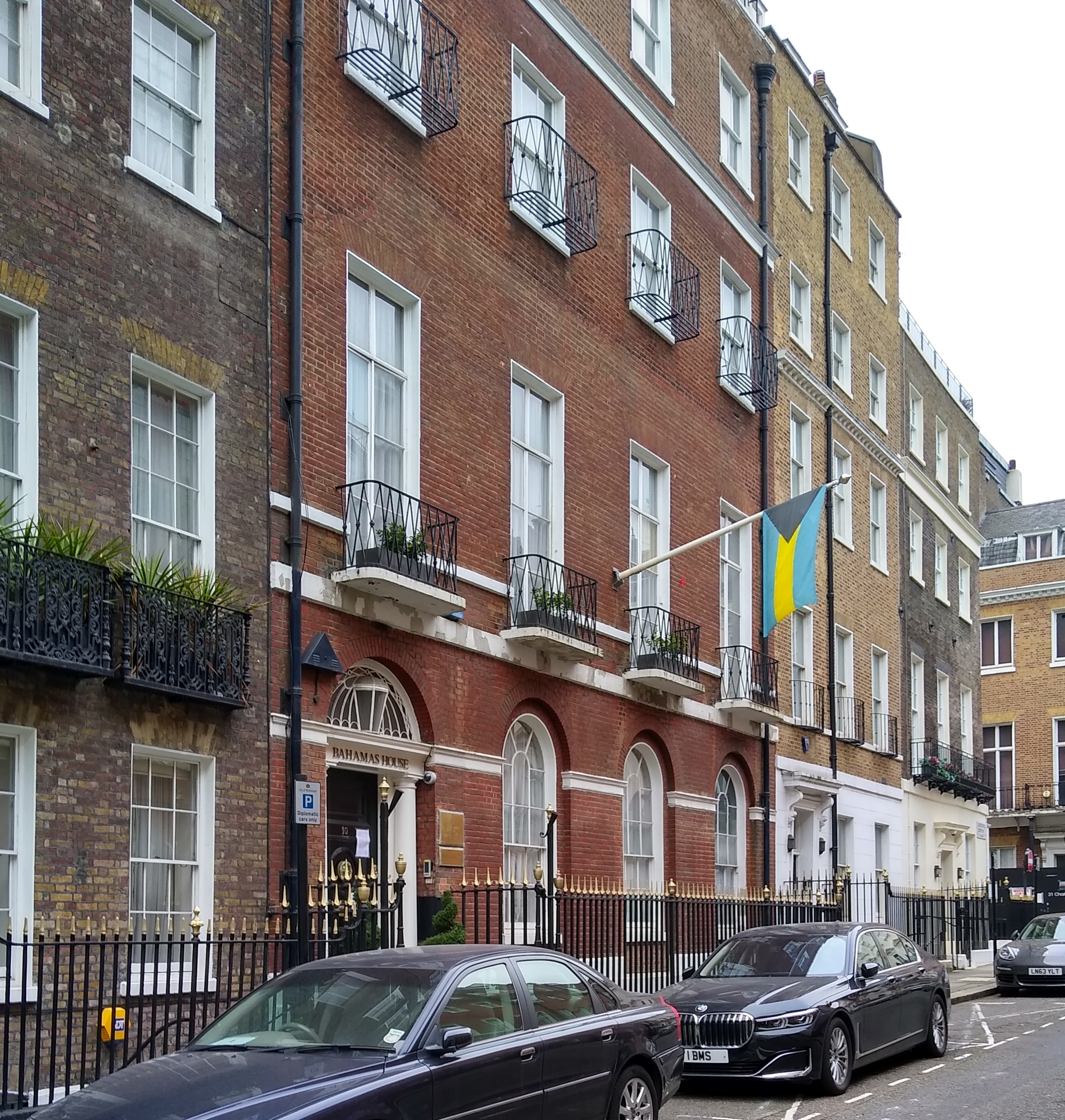
High Commission in London

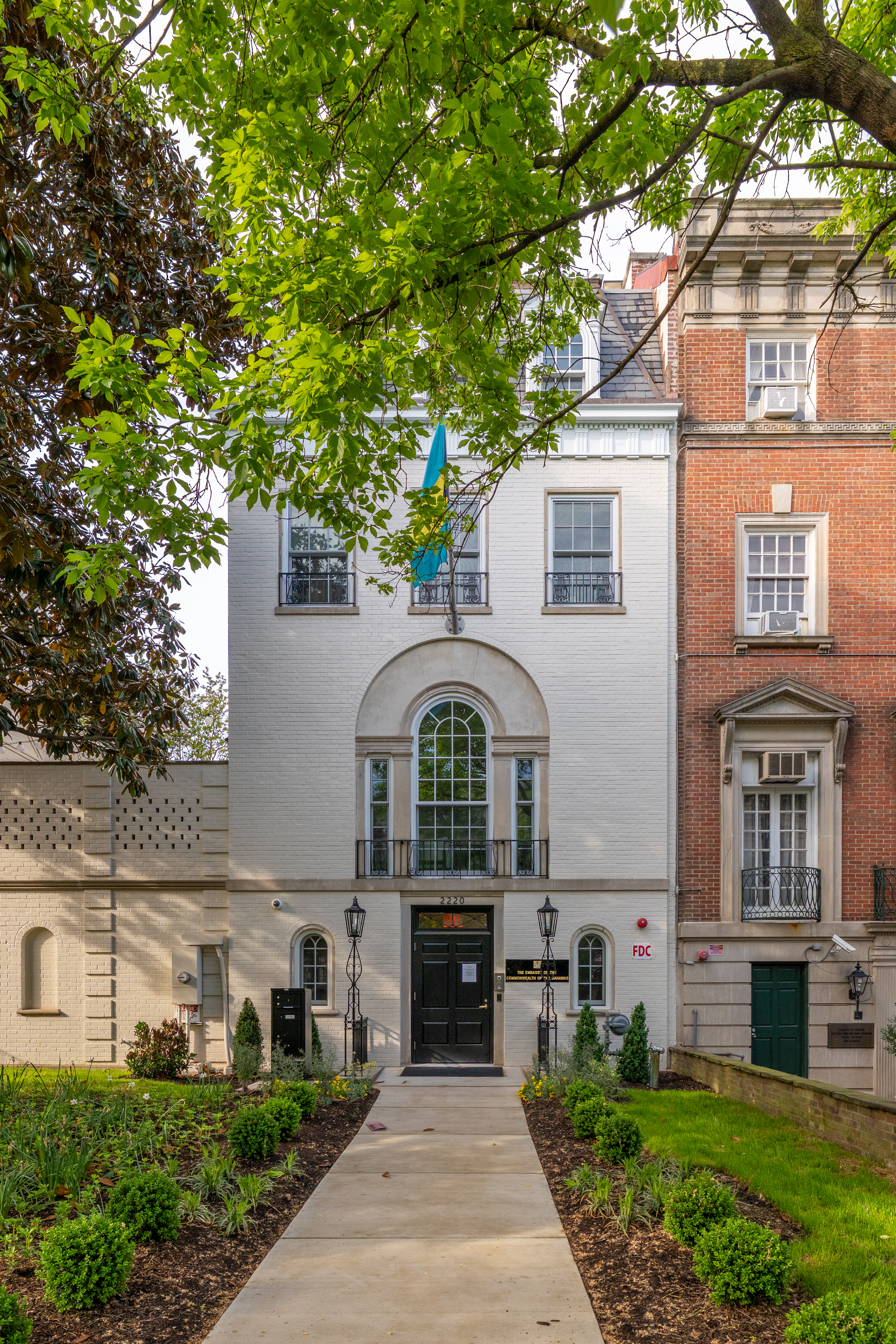
Embassy in Washington, D.C.

== See also ==
- Foreign relations of the Bahamas
