= Culture of the Bahamas =

Bahamian culture is a hybrid of African, European, and other cultures.

== Music ==
Junkanoo is a large contributor to the music of the Bahamas. It is a type of street carnival which occurs on December 26 (Boxing Day) and New Year's Day (January 1). This traditional celebration was started with an African slave by the name of John Canoe. Slaves were given a special holiday at Christmas time, when they could leave the work of the plantation behind and celebrate their freedoms.

The parades are characterized by spectacular costumes made of crepe paper and powerful rhythms beaten traditionally on goatskin drums (accompanied more recently with tom-tom drums or bongo drums) as well as rich brass bands and shaking cow bells. Bahamian music also incorporates other Caribbean forms such as calypso, Trinidadian soca and Jamaican reggae.

Calypso and Rake 'n' Scrape singers and bands such as Baha Men have gained massive popularity in Japan, the United States and elsewhere. Bahamian music continues to be enjoyed by the Bahamian public, with singers such as the late Ronnie Butler, the late "King" Eric Gibson, K.B, Macklyn, and the Brilanders.

== Language ==
English is the official language of the Bahamas. A vast majority of the population speaks Bahamian Dialect, which is a dialect of English intermediate between Standard English and Bahamian Creole. There are some minor regional differences from island to island in terms of pronunciation, but generally all are the same.

A Creole language, or simply a creole, is a stable contact language that emerges when different languages simplify and merge into a new form. Over time, this form develops and becomes a fully established language with native speakers. The process of Creole peoples within Bahamian culture is reflected in the material culture of enslaved families, who integrated African traditions with elements of European influence. Archaeological evidence indicates that these families engaged in a selective appropriation of European goods, reinterpreting their significance and embedding them within their own cultural frameworks. This synthesis is particularly evident in domestic artifacts, clothing, and religious objects, illustrating a complex and adaptive cultural exchange. Such practices highlight the resilience and cleverness of skills within the Bahamian culture, especially in constructing a distinct cultural identity in the context of colonial domination.

=== African influence ===
In Bahamian dialect, some African words and expressions have been retained, such as:

1. yinna - you (plural)
2. nanny - feces or the act of defecation
3. cutting your eye - meaning to glare or roll your eyes disrespectfully.
4. bey - meaning boy or a young boy or young lady; often used as a interjection.
5. mudda sick - defined as "are you kidding me", or "wow".

== Literature ==
The first known published work by a Bahamian is "A narrative of facts, relative to the conduct of Vice-Admiral Gambier, during his late command in North America published in 1782." It was written by James Gambier, 1st Baron Gambier who was born on New Providence Island in the Bahamas in 1756. The first known Black author from the Bahamas was a John Boyd who wrote a book of poetry called "The Vision and Other Poems in Blank Verse," published in 1834.

The population of the Bahamas is 95% Christian, of various denominations, primarily Methodist, Baptist, Anglican and Catholic. There are more churches per capita than in any other country. Bahamians' religious enthusiasm and high regard for education are a consequence of their Puritan heritage, derived from the Eleutheran Adventurers.

=== Storytelling ===
Storytelling and folklore played a large role in the traditional entertainment of Bahamian communities, particularly before the advent of modern television. Many of these highly amusing tales also carry wise lessons. Bahamian storytelling has witnessed some revival through the works of Patricia Glinton-Meicholas and other authors.

Storytelling is one of the customs influenced by African cultures, e.g. in the stories of Ber Bouki and Ber Rabbi, etc.

Bush medicine has been practiced since the times of slavery in the Bahamas. It is still used today to cure many diseases, using local plants.

== Arts ==
=== Straw weaving ===
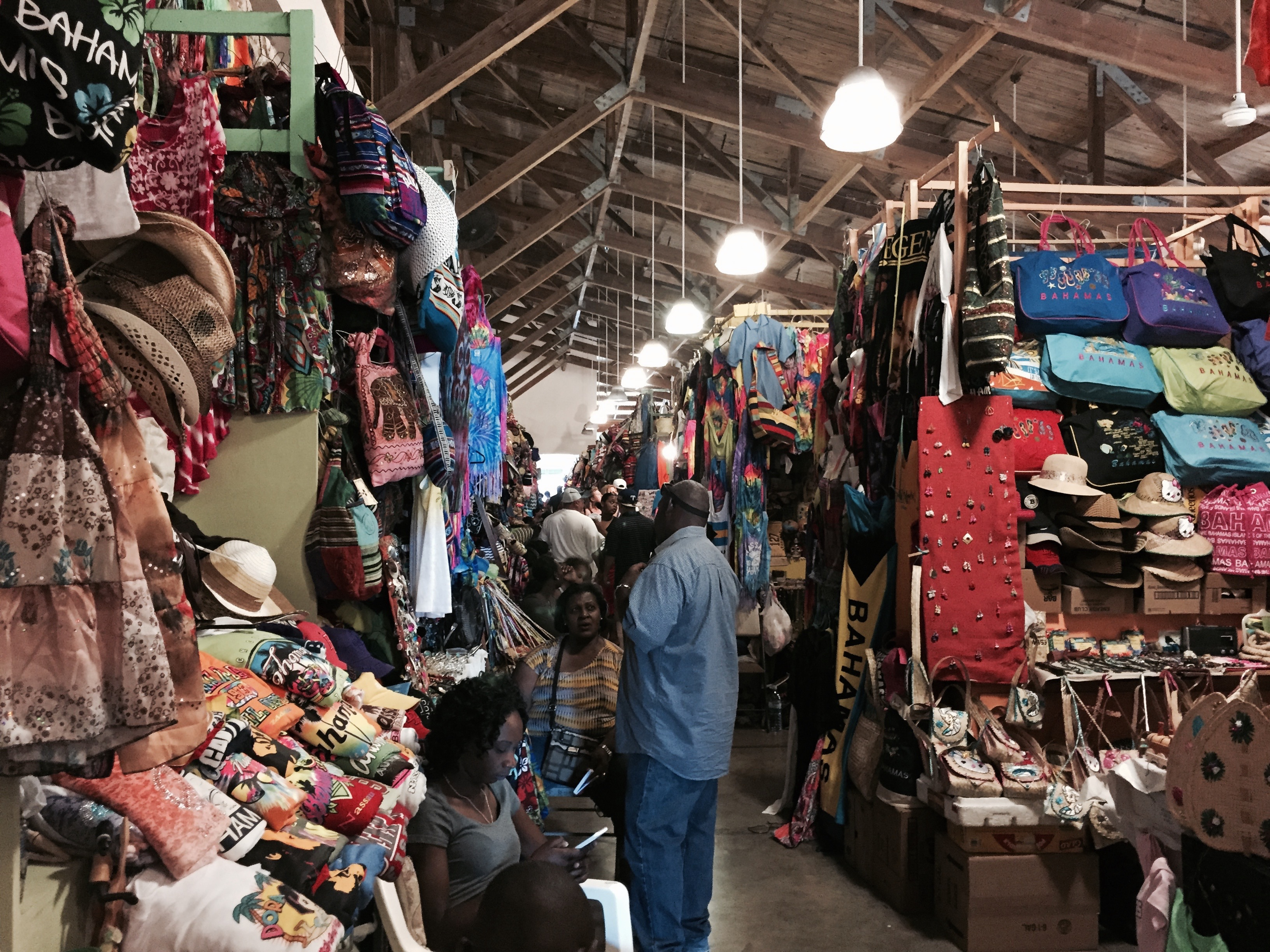
The Straw Market in the capital Nassau.

Traditional crafts include straw work on islands, creating beautiful hats and baskets.

This skill was useful when Bahamians led subsistence lifestyles, with baskets being used for carrying fruit and fishing traps. Today, straw work and wood carvings are produced and sold to tourists in Nassau's Straw Market.

=== Canvas art ===
Beautiful landscapes and the vibrant houses and peoples of the Bahamian archipelago have inspired many artists, both native and foreign. Some notable Bahamian artists include Amos Ferguson (deceased), Eddie Minnis, Brent Malone (deceased), Jackson Burnside (deceased), John Beadle and John Cox.

=== Coral and stone art ===
Hand carvings from coral art and natural stone are cultivated from naturally occurring reef break-offs, beach erosions, outcrops, and smooth rocks. Corals and other crustacean shells are used as horns in Junkanoo or as decorations for one personal needs.

== See also ==
- Public holidays in the Bahamas
- Horace Kenton Wright
- Bahamian cuisine
