= Ronnie Butler =

Bahamian entertainer and singer

Ronnie Butler MBE
- Born: Prince Ronald Butler; August 17, 1937; Nassau, Bahamas
- Died: November 19, 2017 (aged 80); Nassau, Bahamas
- Occupations: Singer; musician; entertainer
- Years active: 1958–2017
- Style: Calypso, Rake-and-scrape
- Children: 5, including Ron Butler Jr.

Prince Ronald Butler Sr., MBE (August 17, 1937 – November 19, 2017) was a Bahamian calypso and rake-and-scrape entertainer and singer. Butler was often referred to as "The Godfather of Bahamian Music" and his career spanned more than five decades.

== Career ==
Butler began his career in music at the age of 16. He performed in Bahamian local nights spots such as Ronnie's Rebel Room, the Rum Key, Big Bamboo, the Trade Winds Lounge, and Nassau Beach Hotel and has toured throughout Europe, South America and North America. Among his popular hits are songs "Burma Road", "Crow Calypso" and "Age Ain't Nothin' But A Number". He achieved great success and career longevity.

Butler's achievements were recognized in 2003 when he was made a Member of the Order of the British Empire (MBE).

== Family ==
Butler was the father of five children, one of which being actor Ron Butler Jr. He was also a grandfather to six grandchildren and a great grandfather to two great grandchildren.

== Death ==
Ronnie Butler died at the age of 80, on the 19th of November, 2017, after a battle with Prostate cancer.

== In popular culture ==
Butler's single, "Married Man", was featured in Tyler Perry's "Why Did I Get Married Too?", which was shot in The Bahamas.
