= Eric Gibson =

Bahamian musician

"King" Eric Gibson was a Bahamian musician and entrepreneur. He was also the semiofficial Ambassador of Bahamian Goodwill.

Gibson was born on the small island of Acklins to a musical family, although he did not pursue music until his adulthood. After leading several musical acts in the 1950s, Gibson formed King Eric & His Knights around 1957, which specialized in a modernized style of calypso music, a type of Caribbean folk music that received worldwide recognition when American singer Harry Belafonte released the album Calypso in 1956. King Eric & His Knights enjoyed immediate popularity among tourists in Nassau, almost certainly due to their performances of the Calypso folksongs made famous by Belafonte. The band regularly performed at nightclubs and hotels, where their records (often in high demand by both tourists and locals) could be purchased in the gift shop. In 1966, Gibson opened a recording studio to support other native Bahamian musicians.

While the lineup of the Knights continued to rotate, King Eric & His Knights remained a popular musical staple in Nassau, often headlining music festivals. In 1973, Gibson formed the "King & Knights Club", a nightclub that not only featured the band, but a variety show that included carnival-style entertainment such as fire juggling and limbo dancing. It was renamed "The Blue Note" in 2006.

King Eric & His Knights also enjoyed popularity outside of the Bahamas, touring in North America and Australia.

While the international appeal of calypso music has dwindled in recent times, Gibson remained a successful entertainer and businessman in Nassau. He was active in the regatta and maintained a successful racing sloop; he also owned an Italian-Bahamian restaurant.

Gibson and his common law wife, Brigitte Neven, were in Florida at the time of Anna Nicole Smith's death. They were invited guests of Anna Nicole, and were among the first to arrive when she began to exhibit signs of trouble.

Gibson died in Nassau, on December 28, 2013, aged 79.

== Partial King Eric & His Knights discography ==
- BAMA Hit Parade (1960)
- Calypso Encores (with Ronnie Butler) (1962)
- King Eric & His Knights at the Big Bamboo (1964)
- Paging King Eric & His Knights (1964)
- Checkmate (1966?)
- All Time Favourites Calipsos [sic] (1966?)
- Emerald Beach Plantation (1971)
- Bahama Goombay Summer (1972)
- Live at the King & Knights Club (1974?)
- Island Boy (1978)

== See also ==
- Shane Gibson, Eric Gibson's son
- List of calypso musicians
