= List of members of the Parliament of the Bahamas =

The following is a list of past and present Members of Parliament (MPs) of the House of Assembly of the Bahamas, the lower house of the Parliament of the Bahamas.

== Colour key ==
Free National Movement
Progressive Liberal Party
Labour Party

== Members ==
Name	Party	Term start	Term end	Constituency	Other positions	Ref.
Malcolm Adderley	PLP	2007	2010	Elizabeth		
James Albury	FNM	2017	2021	Central and South Abaco		
William C. Allen	FNM	1992	2002	Montagu		
Desmond Bannister (Note: Previously served the seat of Carmichael from 2007 to 2012)	FNM	2017	2021	Carmichael	Deputy Prime Minister of the Bahamas (2020–2021)	
Michela Barnett-Ellis	FNM	2026	Present	Killarney		
Keith Bell	PLP	2021	Present	Carmichael		
Carl Bethel	FNM	2007	2012	Sea Breeze		
McKell Bonaby	PLP	2021	Present	Mount Moriah		
Janet Bostwick	FNM	1982	2002	Yamacraw		
Carlton Bowleg	FNM	2017	2021	North Andros and Berry Islands		
Mario Bowleg	PLP	2021	Present	Garden Hills		
Loretta Butler-Turner	FNM	2007	2012	Montagu		
Loretta Butler-Turner	FNM	2012	2017	Long Island		
Frankie Campbell	FNM	2017	2021	Southern Shores		
Jomo Campbell	PLP	2021	Present	Centreville		
Lawrence Cartwright	FNM	2002	2012	Long Island		
Shanendon Cartwright	FNM	2017	Present	St. Barnabas		
Hubert Chipman	FNM	2012	2017	St. Anne's		
Reece Chipman	FNM	2017	2021	Centreville		
Perry Christie	PLP	1977	2017	Centreville	Prime Minister of the Bahamas (2002–2005; 2005–2007; 2012–2017)	
JoBeth Coleby-Davis	PLP	2021	Present	Elizabeth		
Chester Cooper	PLP	2017	Present	The Exumas and Ragged Island		
Kirk Cornish	PLP	2021	Present	North Abaco		
Renardo Curry	PLP	2012	2017	North Abaco		
Dionisio D'Aguilar	FNM	2017	2021	Freetown		
Marvin Dames	FNM	2017	2021	Mount Moriah		
Michael Darville	PLP	2012	2017	Pineridge		
Michael Darville	PLP	2021	Present	Tall Pines		
Philip Davis (Note: Previously served the seat of Cat Island, Rum Cay & San Salvador from 1992 to 1997)	PLP	2002	Present	Cat Island, Rum Cay & San Salvador	Prime Minister of the Bahamas (since 2021)	
Lincoln Deal	FNM	2026	Present	Freetown		
Earl Deveaux	PLP	2007	2012	Marathon		
Patricia Deveaux	PLP	2021	Present	Bamboo Town	Speaker of the House of Assembly of the Bahamas (since 2021)	
Juanianne Dorsett	FNM	1997	2002	Fox Hill		
Kendrick Dorsett	PLP	2012	2017	Southern Shores		
Miriam Emmanuel	FNM	2017	2021	MICAL		
Randol Fawkes	LP	1967	1972	St. Barnabas		
J. Leo Ferguson	FNM	2026	Present	MICAL		
Shonel Ferguson (Note: Previously served the seat of Fox Hill from 2002 to 2017)	FNM	2017	2021	Fox Hill		
Romauld Ferreira	FNM	2017	2021	Marathon		
Jerome Fitzgerald	PLP	2012	2017	Marathon		
Arnold Forbes	PLP	2012	2017	Mount Moriah		
Picewell Forbes	PLP	2007	2021	Mangrove Cay and South Andros		
Michael Foulkes	FNM	2017	2021	Golden Gates		
Bradley Fox	PLP	2026	Present	Central and South Abaco		
Philip Galanis	PLP	1997	2002	Englerston		
Adrian Gibson	FNM	2017	2021	Long Island		
Frazette Gibson	FNM	2026	Present	Central Grand Bahama		
Shane Gibson	PLP	2007	2017	Golden Gates		
Pia Glover-Rolle	PLP	2021	Present	Golden Gates		
Damian Gomez	PLP	2012	2017	Central and South Eleuthera		
Perry Gomez	PLP	2012	2017	North Andros and Berry Islands		
Neko Grant	FNM	2012	2017	Central Grand Bahama		
V. Alfred Gray	PLP	2002	2017	MICAL		
Melanie Griffin	PLP	2002	2017	Yamacraw		
Valentine Grimes	PLP	1977	1982	Fort Charlotte		
Michael Halkitis	PLP	2012	2017	Golden Isles		
Cleola Hamilton	PLP	2012	2017	South Beach		
Glenys Hanna Martin	PLP	2002	Present	Englerston		
Darren Henfield	FNM	2017	2021	North Abaco		
Mark Humes	FNM	2017	2021	Fort Charlotte		
Hubert Ingraham	FNM	1992	2012	North Abaco	Prime Minister of the Bahamas (1992–2002; 2007–2012)	
Oswald Ingraham	PLP	2002	2012	Central and South Eleuthera	Speaker of the House of Assembly of the Bahamas (2002–2007)	
Daniel Johnson	PLP	2012	2017	Carmichael		
Elsworth Johnson	FNM	2017	2021	Yamacraw		
Stephen Hank Johnson	FNM	2017	2021	Central and South Eleuthera		
Edison Key (Note: Previously served the seat of Central and South Abaco from 1977 to 1987)	FNM	2007	2017	Central and South Abaco		
Zhivargo Laing	FNM	1997	2002	Fort Charlotte		
Zhivargo Laing	FNM	2007	2012	Marco City		
Myles Laroda	PLP	2021	Present	Pinewood		
Garnet Levarity	FNM	1977	1982	Pineridge		
Iram Lewis	FNM	2017	Present	Central Grand Bahama		
Richard Lightbourne	FNM	2012	2017	Montagu		
Leonardo Lightbourne	PLP	2021	Present	North Andros and Berry Islands		
Zane Lightbourne	PLP	2021	Present	Yamacraw		
Jeffrey Lloyd	FNM	2017	2021	South Beach		
Leon Lundy	PLP	2021	Present	Mangrove Cay and South Andros		
Howard Mackey	FNM	2017	2021	North Eleuthera		
Kendal Major	FNM	2007	2012	Garden Hills		
Leroy Major	PLP	2021	Present	Southern Shores		
Allyson Maynard Gibson	PLP	2002	2007	Pinewood		
Charles Maynard	FNM	2007	2012	Golden Isles		
Frederick McAlpine	FNM	2017	2021	Pineridge		
Branville McCartney	FNM	2007	2012	Bamboo Town		
Basil McIntosh	PLP	2021	Present	MICAL		
Curtis McMillan	PLP	1967	1972	Fort Charlotte		
James Miller	FNM	1997	2002	Cat Island, Rum Cay & San Salvador		
Leslia Miller-Brice	PLP	2021	Present	Sea Breeze		
Leslie Miller	PLP	2012	2017	Tall Pines		
Vaughn Miller	PLP	2017	2025	Golden Isles		
Hubert Minnis	FNM	2007	Present	Killarney		
Fred Mitchell	PLP	2021	Present	Fox Hill		
Anthony Moss	FNM	2007	2017	The Exumas and Ragged Island		
Halson Moultrie	FNM	2017	2021	Nassau Village		
Ginger Moxey	PLP	2021	Present	Pineridge		
Wayne Munroe	PLP	2021	Present	Freetown		
Theo Neilly	FNM	2012	2017	North Eleuthera		
Phenton Neymour	FNM	2007	2012	South Beach		
S.S. Outten	PLP	1972	?	St. Barnabas		
Vincent Peet	PLP	2002	2012	North Andros and Berry Islands		
Ann E. Percentie	PLP	2002	2007	Pineridge		
Sylvannus Petty	PLP	2021	Present	North Eleuthera		
Darron Pickstock	PLP	2025	Present	Golden Isles		
John Pinder	PLP	2021	Present	Central and South Abaco		
Ryan Pinder	PLP	2010	2017	Elizabeth		
Michael Pintard	FNM	2017	Present	Marco City		
Cynthia A. Pratt	PLP	1997	2017	St. Cecilia		
Lisa Rahming	PLP	2021	Present	Marathon		
Reuben Rahming	FNM	2017	2021	Pinewood		
Bradley Roberts	PLP	1982	2007	Bain Town and Grants Town		
Obie Roberts	PLP	2026	Present	Southern Shores		
Travis Robinson	FNM	2017	2021	Bain Town and Grants Town		
Bacchus Rolle	PLP	2021	Present	South Beach		
Brensil Rolle (Note: Previously served the seat of Garden Hills from 2007 to 2012)	FNM	2017	2021	Garden Hills		
Khaalis Rolle	PLP	2012	2017	Pinewood		
Lanisha T. Rolle	FNM	2017	2021	Sea Breeze		
Andre Rollins	PLP	2012	2017	Fort Charlotte		
Andre Rollins	FNM	2026	Present	Long Island		
Duane Sands	FNM	2017	2021	Elizabeth		
Donal Saunders	FNM	2017	2021	Tall Pines		
Alfred Sears (Note: Previously served the seat of Fort Charlotte from 2000 to 2012)	PLP	2021	Present	Fort Charlotte		
Alvin Smith	FNM	1997	2012	North Eleuthera		
Cornelius A. Smith	FNM	1982	2002	Pineridge	Governor-General of The Bahamas (2019–2023)	
Dion Smith	PLP	2012	2017	Nassau Village		
Kingsley Smith	PLP	2023	Present	West Grand Bahama & Bimini		
Hope Strachan	PLP	2012	2017	Sea Breeze		
Jamahl Strachan	PLP	2021	Present	Nassau Village		
Clay Sweeting	PLP	2021	Present	Central and South Eleuthera		
Brent Symonette (Note: Previously served the seat of St. Anne's from 2007 to 2012)	FNM	2002	2007	Montagu		
Brent Symonette	FNM	2012	2017	St. Anne's		
Vernon Symonette	FNM	1997	2002	MICAL		
E. V. Thompson	PLP	1972	1977	Fort Charlotte		
Kwasi Thompson	FNM	2007	2012	Pineridge		
Kwasi Thompson	FNM	2021	Present	East Grand Bahama		
Peter Turnquest	FNM	2012	2021	East Grand Bahama		
Tommy Turnquest	FNM	1992	2012	Mount Moriah		
Wayde Watson	PLP	2021	Present	Bain Town and Grants Town		
Owen Wells	PLP	2026	Present	St James		
Renward Wells	FNM	2012	2021	Bamboo Town		
Tennyson Wells	FNM	1992	2007	Bamboo Town		
Adrian White	FNM	2021	Present	St. Anne's		
Obie Wilchcombe	PLP	2002	2023	West Grand Bahama and Bimini		
Franklyn Wilson	PLP	1982	1997	Fort Charlotte		
Byron Woodside	FNM	2007	2012	Pinewood		

== Parliaments ==
- 13th Bahamian Parliament
- 14th Bahamian Parliament

== See also ==
- List of Bahamas-related topics
