= Cabinet of the Bahamas =

Executive body

The Cabinet constitutes the executive branch and has general direction and control of the Government of The Bahamas. It is necessary for the Cabinet to comprise at least nine Ministers inclusive of the Prime Minister and Attorney General. All Ministers are Members of Parliament of either the House of Assembly or the Senate. The number of Ministers from the Senate is limited to three. In addition the Prime Minister and the Minister of Finance are required to be members of the House of Assembly. The functions of the Cabinet entail the final determination of government policy, control of government activities and coordination of government Ministries and Departments. The Cabinet meets at least once per week to consider various issues.

== Cabinet Office ==
The Cabinet Office falls under the portfolio of the Prime Minister, and functions as the secretariat to the Cabinet. The Secretary to the Cabinet is responsible for inter-ministerial coordination among the Cabinet and managing government and parliamentary proceedings. Other key responsibilities include administering the Office of the Prime Minister, the Government Printing Department, the National Emergency Management Agency, and the Department of Lands and Surveys as well as advising the Prime Minister on policy. The current Secretary of the Cabinet is Mrs. Nicole Campbell.

== Cabinet Ministries ==
As of 18 May 26, the Cabinet of Prime Minister Philip Davis consists of the following members:

Davis Administration
Minister	Office(s)	Department	Took office
Cabinet ministers
The Hon. Philip "Brave" Davis MP for Cat Island, Rum Cay & San Salvador	Prime Minister	-	21 September 2021 (4 years ago)
The Hon. Chester Cooper MP for The Exumas and Ragged Island	Deputy Prime Minister; Minister of Education, Science and Technology	Ministry of Education, Science and Technology	21 September 2021 (4 years ago)
The Hon. Michael Halkitis	Minister of Finance	Ministry of Finance	17 May 2026 (24 days ago)
The Hon. Wayne Munroe Senator	Attorney General and Ministry of Legal Affairs	Attorney General and Ministry of Legal Affairs	17 May 2026 (24 days ago)
The Hon. Fred Mitchell MP for Fox Hill	Minister of Foreign Affairs	Ministry of Foreign Affairs	21 September 2021 (4 years ago)
The Hon. Glenys Hanna Martin MP for Englerston	Minister of Tourism	Ministry of Tourism	17 May 2026 (24 days ago)
The Hon. Dr. Michael Darville MP for Tall Pines	Minister of Health and Wellness	Ministry of Health and Wellness	21 September 2021 (4 years ago)
The Hon. Clay Sweeting MP for Central and South Eleuthera	Minister of Works and Family Island Affairs	Ministry of Works and Family Island Affairs	4 September 2023 (2 years ago)
The Hon. Keith Bell MP for Carmichael	Minister of Housing and Land Reform	Ministry of Housing and Land Reform	4 September 2023 (2 years ago)
The Hon. JoBeth Coleby-Davis MP for Elizabeth	Minister of Energy, Utility and Aviation	Ministry of Energy, Utility and Aviation	4 September 2023 (2 years ago)
The Hon. Ginger Moxey MP for Garden Hills	Minister for Grand Bahama	Ministry for Grand Bahama	21 September 2021 (4 years ago)
The Hon. Mario Bowleg MP for Garden Hills	Minister of Youth, Sports and Culture	Ministry of Youth, Sports and Culture	21 September 2021 (4 years ago)
The Hon. Jomo Campbell MP for Centreville	Minister of Agriculture and Marine Resources	Ministry of Agriculture and Marine Resources	4 September 2023 (2 years ago)
The Hon. Pia Glover-Rolle MP for Golden Gates	Minister of Labour, Public Service and National Insurance	Ministry of Labour, Public Service and National Insurance	4 September 2023 (2 years ago)
The Hon. Zane Lightbourne MP for Yamacraw	Minister of Environment and Natural Resources	Ministry of Environment and Natural Resources	17 May 2026 (24 days ago)
The Hon. Myles LaRoda MP for Pinewood	Minister of National Security	Ministry of National Security	17 May 2026 (24 days ago)
The Hon. Leon Lundy MP for Mangrove Cay and South Andros	Minister of Transport	Ministry of Transport	17 May 2026 (24 days ago)
The Hon. Lisa Rahming MP for Marathon	Minister of Urban Renewal and Community Relations	Ministry of Urban Renewal and Community Relations	17 May 2026 (24 days ago)
The Hon. Leslia Miller-Brice MP for Sea Breeze	Minister of Culture, Arts and Heritage	Ministry of Culture, Arts and Heritage	17 May 2026 (24 days ago)
The Hon. Sen. Jerome Fitzgerald Senator	Minister of Economic Affairs	Ministry of Economic Affairs	17 May 2026 (24 days ago)
The Hon. Barbara Cartwright Senator	Minister of Social Services	Ministry of Social Services	17 May 2026 (24 days ago)
The Hon. Sebastian Bastian MP for Fort Charlotte	Minister of Innovation and National Development	Ministry of Innovation and National Development	17 May 2026 (24 days ago)

== Ministers of State ==
Cabinet Ministers may delegate certain daily operations of a department under their control to a Minister of State. The Cabinet Minister maintains sole accountability to Parliament for the faithful exercise of department powers by a Minister of State. The Prime Minister may choose to assign a courtesy title that appropriately describes the duties assigned to a Minister of State. Such a courtesy title is distinct from the title of a Cabinet Minister, which is delegated by law through an Act of Parliament.

=== Currently designated Ministers of State ===
- Bacchus Rolle, MP for South Beach, Minister of State for Social Services
- Wayde Watson, MP for Bain Town and Grants Town, Minister of State for Innovation and National Development
- Leonardo Lightbourne, MP for North Andros and Berry Islands, Minister of State for Agriculture and Marine Resources
- Kirk Cornish, MP for North Abaco, Minister of State in the Office of the Prime Minister
- McKell Bonaby, MP for Mount Moriah, Minister of State in the Office of the Prime Minister
- Darron Pickstock, MP for Golden Isles, Minister of State for Immigration in the Ministry of Foreign Affairs
- Owen Wells, MP for St James, Minister of State in the Ministry of Health and Wellness
