= 13th Bahamian Parliament =

Parliament of the Bahamas

←	12th	14th	→
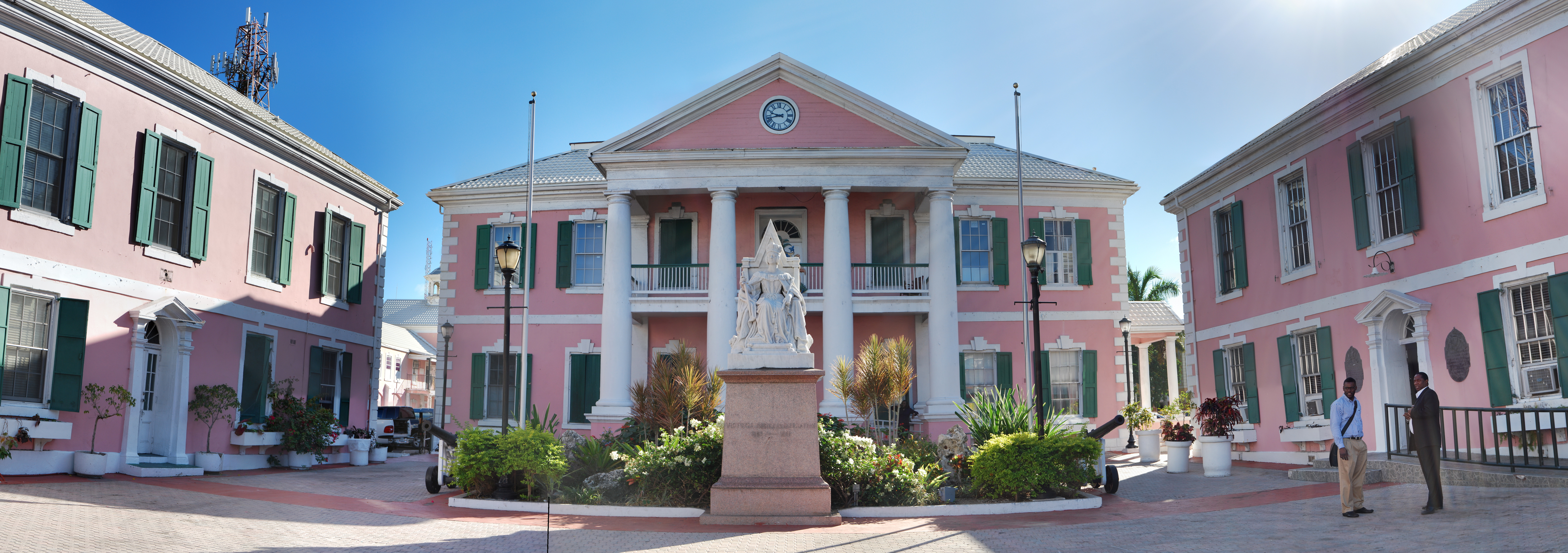

Overview
- Legislative body: Parliament of The Bahamas
- Jurisdiction: The Bahamas
- Meeting place: Bahamian Parliament Building
- Term: 2017 – 2021
- Election: 2017 general election
- Government: Free National Movement
- Opposition: Progressive Liberal Party

House of Assembly
- Members: 39
- Speaker: Halson Moultrie
- Prime Minister: Hubert Minnis
- Leader of the Opposition: Philip Davis

Senate
- Members: 16
- President: Katherine Forbes-Smith (2017–2019); Mildred Hall-Watson (2019–2021)

Crown-in-Parliament Elizabeth II

The 13th Bahamian Parliament was elected in the 2017 Bahamian general election.

== Members ==
Party	Name	Constituency	Ref.
Free National Movement (35)	Travis Robinson	Bain Town & Grants Town	
Free National Movement (35)	Renward Wells	Bamboo Town	
Free National Movement (35)	Thomas Desmond Bannister	Carmichael	
Free National Movement (35)	James Albury	Central and South Abaco	
Free National Movement (35)	Hank Johnson	Central and South Eleuthera	
Free National Movement (35)	Iram Lewis	Central Grand Bahama	
Free National Movement (35)	Reece Chipman	Centreville (Note: Chipman left the FNM in February 2021.)	
Free National Movement (35)	K. Peter Turnquest	East Grand Bahama	
Free National Movement (35)	Duane Sands	Elizabeth	
Free National Movement (35)	Mark Humes	Fort Charlotte	
Free National Movement (35)	Shonel Ferguson	Fox Hill	
Free National Movement (35)	Dionisio D'Aguilar	Freetown	
Free National Movement (35)	Brensil Rolle	Garden Hills	
Free National Movement (35)	Michael Foulkes	Golden Gates	
Free National Movement (35)	Vaughn Miller	Golden Isles (Note: Miller defected to the PLP in September 2020.)	
Free National Movement (35)	Hubert Minnis	Killarney	
Free National Movement (35)	Adrian Gibson	Long Island	
Free National Movement (35)	Romauld Ferreira	Marathon	
Free National Movement (35)	Michael Pintard	Marco City	
Free National Movement (35)	Miriam Emmanuel	MICAL	
Free National Movement (35)	Marvin Dames	Mount Moriah	
Free National Movement (35)	Halson Moultrie	Nassau Village (Note: Moultrie left the FNM in February 2021.)	
Free National Movement (35)	Darren Henfield	North Abaco	
Free National Movement (35)	Carlton Bowleg Jr.	North Andros and Berry Islands	
Free National Movement (35)	Howard Mackey	North Eleuthera	
Free National Movement (35)	Frederick McAlpine	Pineridge (Note: McAlpine left the FNM in July 2021.)	
Free National Movement (35)	Reuben Rahming	Pinewood	
Free National Movement (35)	Lanisha T. Rolle	Sea Breeze	
Free National Movement (35)	Jeffrey Lloyd	South Beach	
Free National Movement (35)	Frankie Campbell	Southern Shores	
Free National Movement (35)	Brent Symonette	St. Anne's	
Free National Movement (35)	Shanendon Cartwright	St. Barnabas	
Free National Movement (35)	Donald Saunders	Tall Pines	
Free National Movement (35)	Pakesia Parker-Edgecombe	West Grand Bahama & Bimini	
Free National Movement (35)	Elsworth Johnson	Yamacraw	
Progressive Liberal Party (4)	Philip "Brave" Davis	Cat Island, Rum Cay & San Salvador	
Progressive Liberal Party (4)	Glenys Hanna Martin	Englerston	
Progressive Liberal Party (4)	Chester Cooper	The Exumas and Ragged Island	
Progressive Liberal Party (4)	Picewell Forbes	Mangrove Cay and South Andros	
