= Phenton Neymour =

Bahamian politician (1964–2018)

Phenton O. Neymour

Minister of State for the Environment
- In office July 2008 – 2012
- Minister: Parliament of the Bahamas
- Constituency: South Beach
- In office 2007–2012

Personal details
- Born: September 3, 1964 Steventon, Exuma, The Bahamas
- Died: July 23, 2018 (aged 53) Nassau, New Providence, The Bahamas
- Party: Free National Movement
- Other political affiliations: Coalition for Democratic Reform
- Education: Syracuse University, B.S. and M.S. University of Miami, MBA
- Occupation: Engineer and pilot

Phenton O. Neymour (September 3, 1964 – July 23, 2018) was a Bahamian politician. He was a minister of the Cabinet of the Bahamas and a member of the Parliament of the Bahamas. He was a founder of the Coalition for Democratic Reform, which eventually merged with the Free National Movement, the political party that his father helped establish.

== Early life ==
Phenton O. Neymour was born on September 3, 1964, in Steventon, Exuma, in The Bahamas. His parents were Ena and Basil Neymour. Basic Neymour was instrumental in the creation of the Free National Movement and served as a candidate in three general elections.

Neymour received his primary and secondary education at St Paul's College in Freeport, Bahamas, graduating in 1980, followed by graduating from Queen's College, Nassau in 1982. He then attended to Syracuse University, graduating with a Bachelor of Science in chemical engineering and Master of Science in environmental engineering. While at Syracuse, he was member of Phi Beta Sigma. Neyour also graduated with the University of Miami with an MBA.

== Career ==
Neymour worked as an engineer. He was active in the trade union movement for eleven years, serving as president of the Water and Sewage Corporate Management Union and as the assistant secretary general of The Bahamas Trade Union Congress. He was also a pilot for sixteen years, with both American and British licenses.

Neymour formed the Coalition for Democratic Reform (CDR) with B. J. Nottate and Charles Maynard. Neymour served as the chief operations officer of the CDR. Later, the CDR joined the Free National Movement.

He was elected as a member of Parliament of the Bahamas (MP) for South Beach in the 2007 Bahamian general election, as a member of the Free National Movement. He became the Minister of State for Public Utilities on May 14, 2007. Neymour was the Minister of State for the Environment from July 2008 until 2012. He was also the Minister of State for Works.

Neymour unsuccessfully ran as the MP candidate for The Exumas and Ragged Island in the 2012 Bahamian general election. In 2018, Neymour publicly supported the legalization of medical marijuana in The Bahamas, based on personal experience in the United States.

== Personal life ==
Neymour and his wife, Juliet, had four children, Jonathan Neymour, Khalon Neymour, Ashley Neymour, and Tiara Neymour. After a divorce, Neymour married to Cutelle Mikula of North Abaco in December 2015.

Neymour was a director and, later, president of The Bahamas Primary School Students of the Year Foundation. He was a member of the Christ Church Cathedral.

Neymour was diagnosed with colorectal cancer on February 10, 2014. He traveled to Miami, Florida several times for treatment, going into remission twice. He died at the age of 53 on July 23, 2018, in his home at 17 Hutchinson Street in Nassau. He was buried in Woodlawn Gardens.

== See also ==
- List of members of the Parliament of the Bahamas
