= 2012 Bahamian general election =

- 7 May 2012

All 38 seats in the House of Assembly 20 seats needed for a majority
- Registered: 171,932
- Turnout: 90.78% (▼1.33pp)
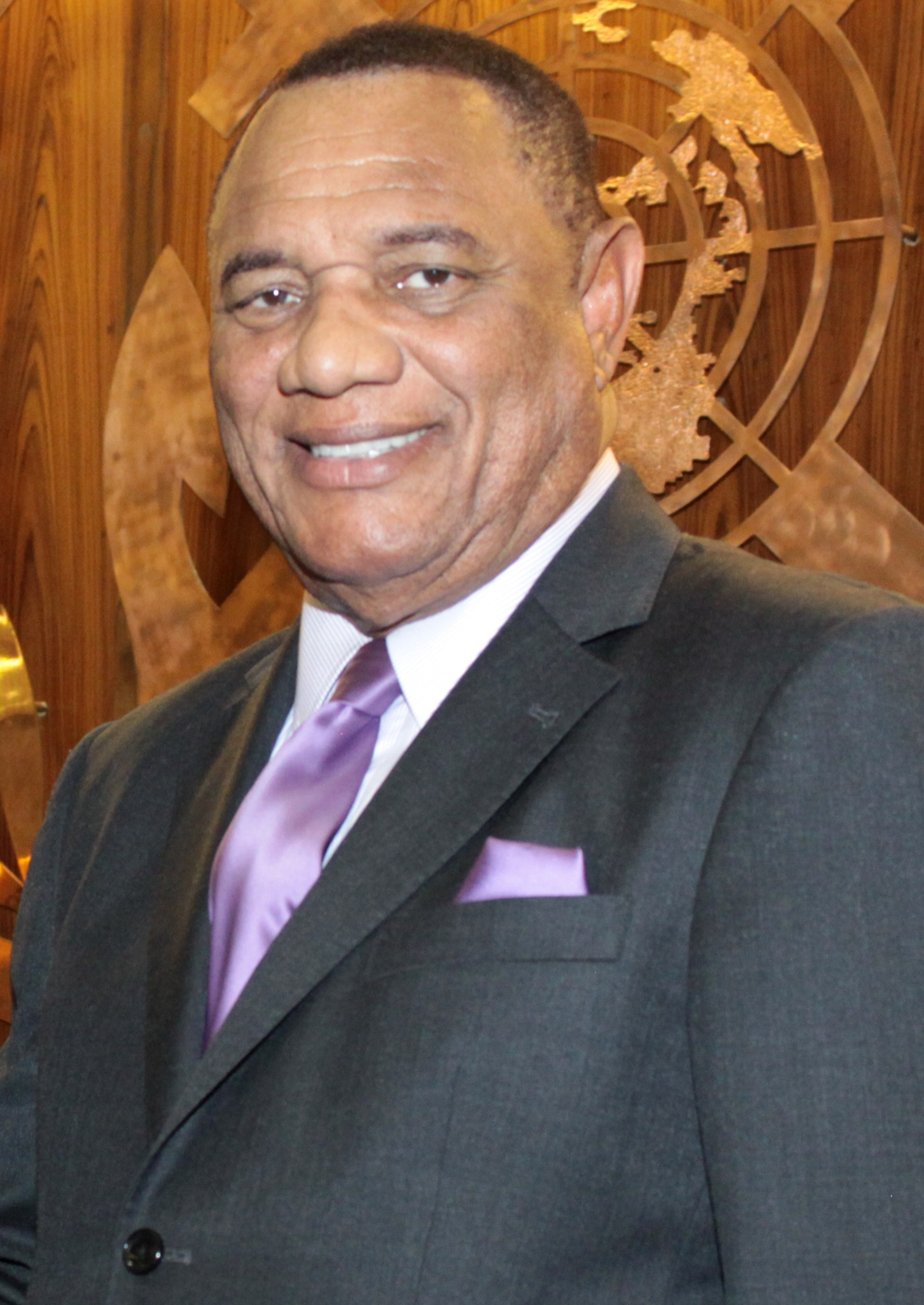

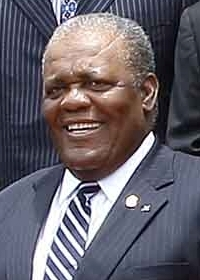
	First party	Second party
Leader	Perry Christie	Hubert Ingraham
Party	PLP	FNM
Leader's seat	Centreville	North Abaco
Last election	47.02%, 18 seats	49.86%, 23 seats
Seats won	29	9
Seat change	▲11	▼14
Popular vote	75,815	65,633
Percentage	48.62%	42.09%
Swing	▲1.60 pp	▼7.77 pp
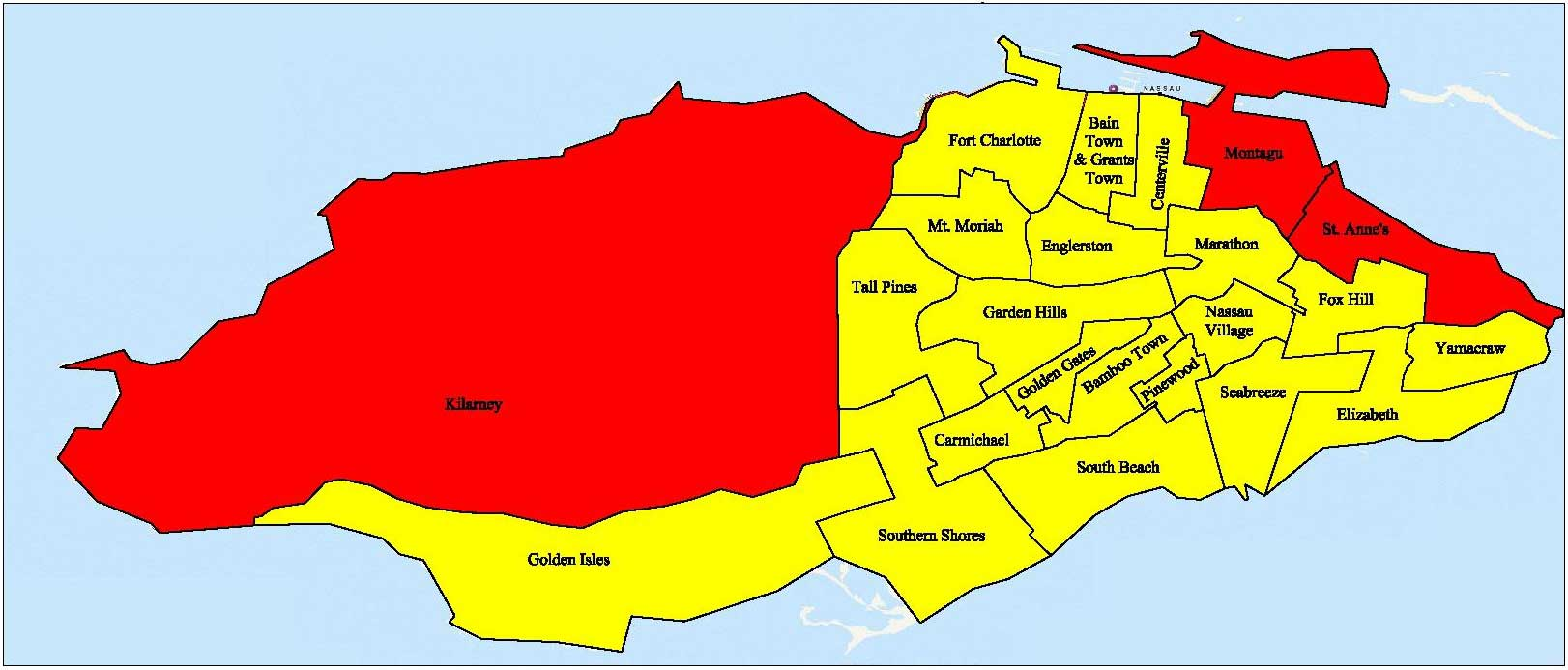
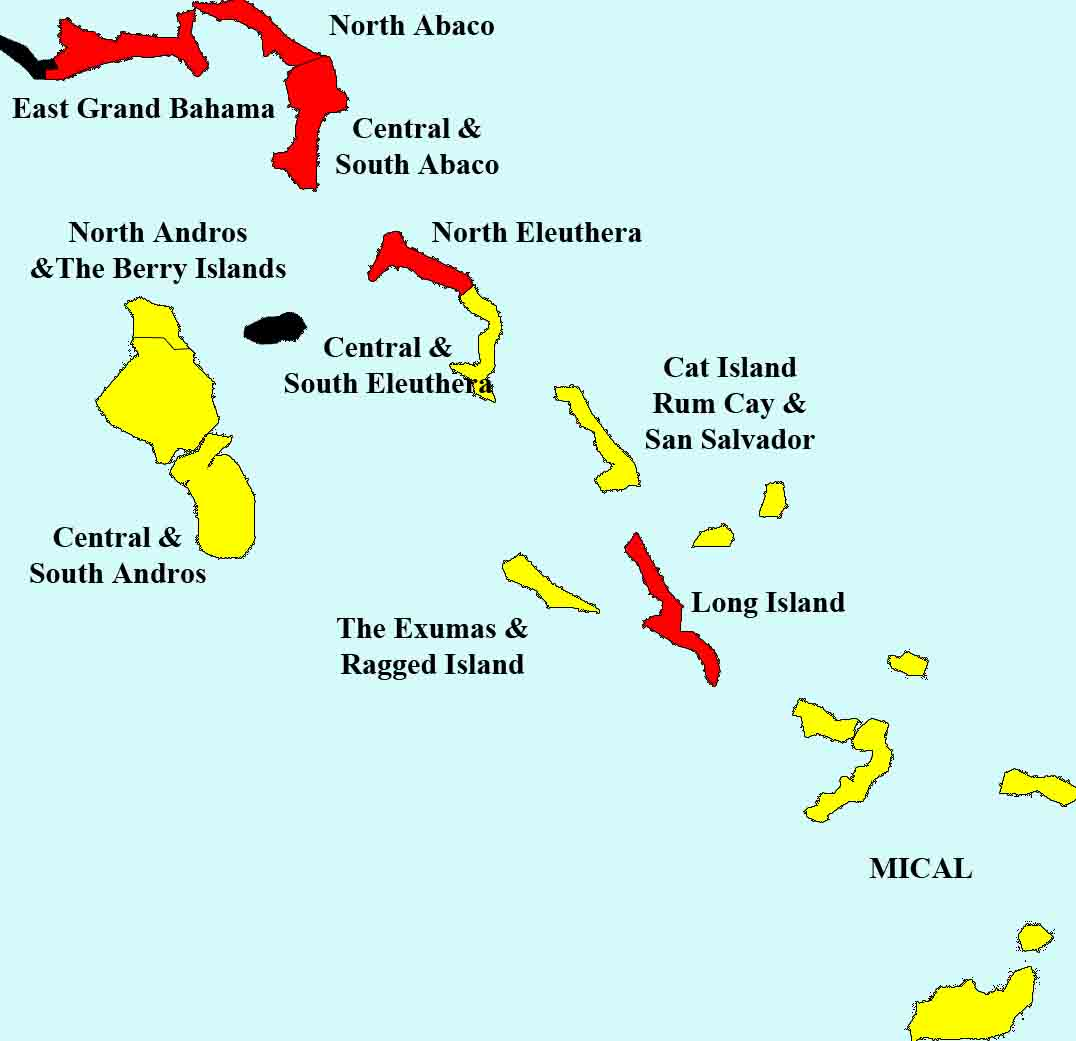
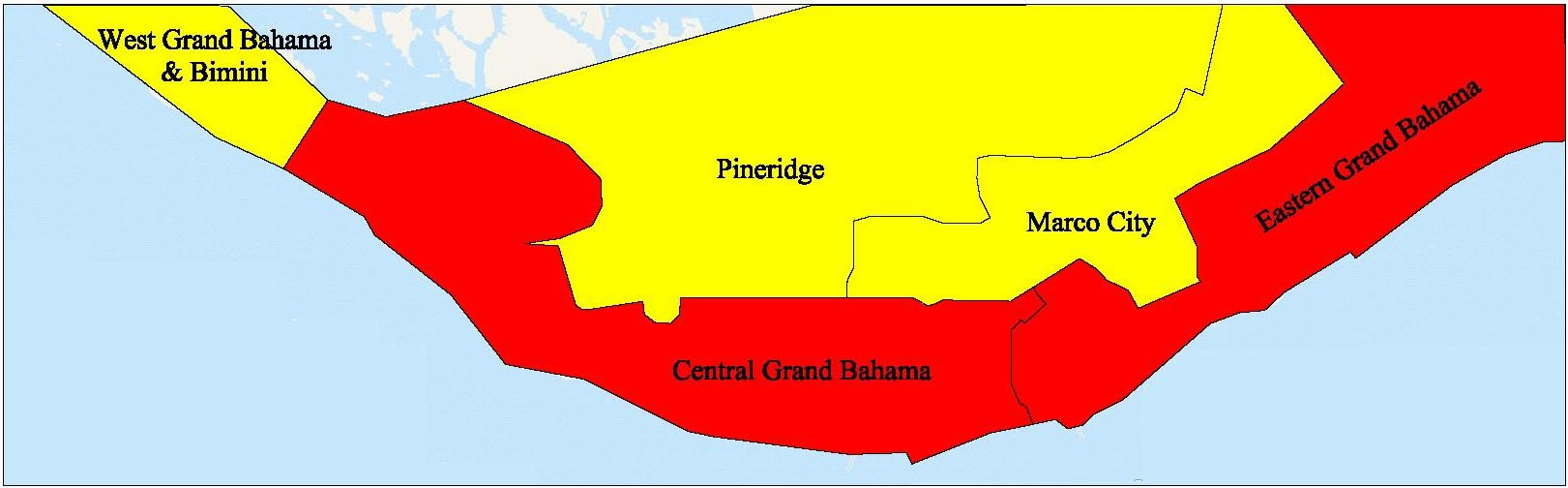
- Results in New Providence (top), Family Island (centre) and Grand Bahama (bottom)
Prime Minister before election
Hubert Ingraham
FNM
Elected Prime Minister
Perry Christie
PLP

General elections were held in the Bahamas on 7 May 2012. They were the first general election in which a third party (the Democratic National Alliance) offered a full slate of candidates alongside the two major parties, the Free National Movement and the Progressive Liberal Party (PLP). The result was a victory for the opposition PLP, whose leader Perry Christie became prime minister.

== Background ==
The Free National Movement had defeated the Progressive Liberal Party in the 2007 general election amid a scandal involving the residency status of model and reality television star Anna Nicole Smith and allegations that the PLP's then-immigration minister had fast-tracked her application to live in the islands.

== Opinion polls ==
An opinion poll was carried out by Public Domain, a market research and public opinion polling company, between 2 and 12 March 2012 that involved 501 respondents. A sample of this proportion only represented a maximum margin of error of 4.4 per cent. The poll showed that the Free National Movement's (FNM) core support was the highest at 30.5 per cent, followed by the Progressive Liberal Party (PLP) at 23.7 per cent, and the Democratic National Alliance (DNA) at 16.5 per cent. A total of 12.2 per cent of the sample were undecided voters. Also the poll revealed that the PLP's swing voters constituted 6.6 per cent of the sample; the largest swing voter percentage. They were followed by the DNA ( who had 5.2 per cent swing voters ) and the FNM ( who had 3.7 per cent swing voters ). Therefore, the total support for the FNM was around 34.2 per cent, which was followed by the PLP's 30.3 per cent and the DNA's 21.7 per cent. If any of the two leading parties were to win the support of the entire 12.2 per cent undecided voters, they would win the general election. A question was asked during the polling process that went, According to you, which party will win the next election?. The results were that the FNM would ( at 32% ), the PLP would ( at 32% ) and the DNA would ( at 8% ) win the next general election. The poll also reported that 52% of the electorate was against reelecting the incumbent Free National Movement, while 55.9% opposed electing the PLP and 64.5% rejected electing the DNA.

== Results ==
The opposition Progressive Liberal Party (PLP) won a majority in a landslide election victory, taking 30 of the 38 seats in parliament. PLP leader Perry Christie, who had previously served as Prime Minister, was sworn into office on 8 May 2012, at approximately 4 pm.

Outgoing Prime Minister Hubert Ingraham announced his retirement from politics following the defeat of his Free National Movement (FNM). He had served in Parliament for thirty-five years, winning re-election seven times, including 2012. Ingraham told supporters, "I gave it the best I could and now I've been rejected by the public of the Bahamas...We had no indication from the general public they would go that way." Ingraham then confirmed his retirement, saying, "I am going to go back to my little law office and enjoy life with my family."

The Democratic National Alliance lost the only seat it held in the prior parliament (that of Branville McCartney, its founder and only MP) and elected no candidates.

Party	Votes	%	Seats	+/–
Progressive Liberal Party	75,815	48.62	29	+11
Free National Movement	65,633	42.09	9	–14
Democratic National Alliance	13,225	8.48	0	New
Bahamas Constitution Party	96	0.06	0	New
Independents	1,177	0.75	0	0
Total	155,946	100.00	38	–3
Valid votes	155,946	99.91		
Invalid/blank votes	142	0.09		
Total votes	156,088	100.00		
Registered voters/turnout	171,932	90.78		
Source: Caribbean Elections

=== By constituency ===
Electoral District Total votes	Candidates				Incumbent
Electoral District Total votes	Free National Movement	Progressive Liberal Party	Democratic National Alliance	Other	Incumbent
Bain Town and Grants Town; 4,962	John Henry Bostwick; 1,754 (35.35%)	Bernard Nottage; 2,856 (57.56%)	Rodney Moncur; 333 (6.71%)	Mario Clarke (IND); 19 (0.38%)	Bernard Nottage
Bamboo Town; 4,952	Cassius Stuart; 1,661 (33.54%)	Renward Wells; 1,940 (39.18%)	Branville McCartney; 1,022 (20.64%)	Craig Butler (IND); 329 (6.64%)	Branville McCartney
Carmichael; 4,769	Darron Cash; 2,063 (43.26%)	Daniel Johnson; 2,157 (45.23%)	Theofanis Chochinamogulos; 527 (11.05%)	Glen Rolle (IND); 22 (0.46%)	Desmond Bannister
Cat Island, Rum Cay & San Salvador; 1,480	Michael Pintard; 693 (46.82%)	Philip "Brave" Davis; 778 (52.57%)	Shawn Francis; 9 (0.61%)		Philip Brave Davis
Central and South Abaco; 2,967	Edison Key; 1,490 (50.22%)	Gary Sawyer; 1,235 (41.62%)	Roscoe Thompson; 242 (8.16%)		Edison Key
Central and South Eleuthera; 2,775	Howard Johnson; 1,326 (47.78%)	Damian Gomez; 1,392 (50.16%)	William Hunt; 57 (2.05%)		James Ingraham
Central Grand Bahama; 5,202	Neko Grant; 2,505 (48.15%)	Julian Russell; 2,354 (45.25%)	Howard Grant, Jr. 343 (6.59%)		New district
Centreville; 4,853	Ella Lewis; 1,601 (32.99%)	Perry Christie; 2,950 (60.79%)	Celi Moss; 302 (6.22%)		New district
East Grand Bahama; 4,758	Peter Turnquest; 2,239 (47.06%)	Tanisha Tynes; 2,060 (43.30%)	Ferline Bridgewater-Thomas; 402 (8.45%)	Philip Thomas (IND); 57 (1.20%)	New district
Elizabeth; 4,372	Duane Sands; 1,925 (44.03%)	Ryan Pinder; 2,049 (46.87%)	Charlene Paul; 385 (8.81%)	Jay Armbrister (IND); 13 (0.30%)	Ryan Pinder
Englerston; 4,806	Caron Shepard; 1,576 (32.79%)	Glenys Hanna Martin; 2,962 (61.63%)	Nicholas Jacques; 219 (4.56%)	S. Ali McIntosh (BCP); 18 (0.37%); Paul Rolle (IND); 5 (0.10%); C. Rashard Amahad (IND); 7 (0.15%); Alexander Morley (IND); 19 (0.40%)	Glenys Hanna Martin
Exumas and Ragged Island; 2,697	Phenton Neymour; 1,235 (45.79%)	Anthony Moss; 1,355 (50.24%)	Floyd Ambrister; 94 (3.49%)	Colin Miller (BCP); 8 (0.30%); Reginald Smith (IND); 5 (0.19%)	Anthony Moss
Fort Charlotte; 4,620	Zhivargo Laing; 1,975 (42.75%)	Andre Rollins; 2,126 (46.02%)	Mark Humes; 519 (11.23%)		Alfred Sears
Fox Hill; 4,370	Shonell Ferguson; 1,571 (35.95%)	Fred Mitchell; 2,448 (56.02%)	Kendal Smith; 351 (8.03%)		Fred Mitchell
Garden Hills; 4,512	Brensil Rolle; 1,913 (42.40%)	Kendal Major; 2,181 (48.34%)	Kelphene Cunningham; 382 (8.47%)	Paul Moss (IND); 36 (0.80%)	Brensil Rolle
Golden Gates; 4,822	Winsome Miller; 1,556 (32.27%)	Shane Gibson; 2,831 (58.71%)	Allsworth Pickstock; 435 (9.02%)		Shane Gibson
Golden Isles; 4,614	Charles Maynard; 1,813 (39.29%)	Michael Halkitis; 2,220 (48.11%)	Farrell Goff; 581 (12.59%)		Michael Halkitis
Killarney; 4,598	Hubert Minnis; 2,434 (52.94%)	Jerome Gomez; 1,642 (35.71%)	Prodesta Moore; 522 (11.35%)		Hubert Minnis
Long Island; 1,729	Loretta Butler-Turner; 979 (56.62%)	Alex Storr; 531 (30.71%)	Mario Cartwright; 219 (12.67%)		Lawrence Cartwright
Mangrove Cay and South Andros; 2,037	Ronald Bostfield; 532 (26.12%)	Picewell Forbes; 794 (38.98%)	Wayde Forbes; 85 (4.17%)	Whitney Bastian (IND); 626 (30.73%)	Picewell Forbes
Marathon; 4,408	Heather Hunt; 1,907 (43.26%)	Jerome Fitzgerald; 2,164 (49.09%)	Karen Davis; 337 (7.65%)		Earl Deveaux
Marco City; 5,112	Norris Bain; 2,287 (44.74%)	Gregory Moss; 2,528 (49.45%)	Tolonus Sands; 284 (5.56%)	Leslie Minus (IND); 13 (0.25%)	Zhivargo Laing
MICAL; 1,325	Sidney Collie; 650 (49.06%)	V. Alfred Gray; 672 (50.72%)	Jamarl Chea; 3 (0.23%)		V. Alfred Gray
Montagu; 4,750	Richard Lightbourn; 2,227 (46.88%)	Frank Smith; 1,999 (42.08%)	Benjamin Albury; 514 (10.82%)	Graham Weatherford (IND); 10 (0.21%)	Loretta Turner
Mount Moriah; 4,746	Tommy Turnquest; 2,013 (42.41%)	Arnold Forbes; 2,262 (47.66%)	Wayne Munroe; 471 (9.92%)		Tommy Turnquest
Nassau Village; 4,692	Basil Moss; 1,518 (32.35%)	Dion Smith; 2,308 (49.19%)	Christopher Mortimer; 834 (17.77%)	Simon Smith (BCP); 32 (0.68%)	New district
North Abaco; 4,130	Hubert Ingraham; 2,235 (54.12%)	Renardo Curry; 1,856 (44.94%)	Sonith Lockhart; 39 (0.94%)		Hubert Ingraham
North Andros and Berry Islands; 2,445	Desmond Bannister; 1,168 (47.77%)	Perry Gomez; 1,192 (48.75%)	Randy Butler; 85 (3.48%)		Vincent Peet
North Eleuthera; 3,520	Theo Neilly; 1,787 (50.77%)	Clay Sweeting; 1,686 (47.90%)	George Taylor; 47 (1.34%)		Alvin Smith
Pineridge; 4,637	Kwasi Thompson; 1,808 (38.99%)	Michael Darville; 2,635 (56.83%)	Osman Johnson; 194 (4.18%)		James Thompson
Pinewood; 4,419	Byron Woodside; 1,763 (39.90%)	Khaalis Rolle; 2,231 (50.49%)	Wellington Woods; 409 (9.26%)	Elkin Sutherland (IND); 16 (0.36%)	Byron Woodside
Sea Breeze; 4,556	Carl Bethel; 1,897 (41.64%)	Hope Strachan; 2,095 (45.98%)	Alfred Poitier; 543 (11.92%)	Brenda T. Harris (BCP); 21 (0.46%)	Carl Bethel
South Beach; 4,450	Monique Gomez; 1,785 (40.11%)	Cleola Hamilton; 2,029 (45.60%)	Wallace Rolle; 619 (13.91%)	James Williams (BCP); 17 (0.38%)	Phenton Neymour
Southern Shores; 4,342	Kenyatta Gibson; 1,762 (40.58%)	Kendrick Dorsett; 2,080 (47.90%)	Madeline Sawyer; 500 (11.52%)		New district
St. Anne's; 4,337	Hubert Chipman; 2,348 (54.14%)	Gregory Burrows; 1,532 (35.32%)	Prince Smith; 457 (10.54%)		Brent Symonette
Tall Pines; 4,451	Karen Butler; 1,549 (34.80%)	Leslie Miller; 2,516 (56.53%)	Dario Terrelli; 386 (8.67%)		New district
West Grand Bahama & Bimini; 5,191	Pakesia Parker; 2,233 (43.02%)	Obediah Wilchcombe; 2,877 (55.42%)	Rodger Rolle; 81 (1.56%)		Obediah Wilchcombe
Yamacraw; 4,522	Dion Foulkes; 1,856 (41.04%)	Melanie Griffin; 2,292 (50.69%)	Maurice Smith; 374 (8.27%)		Melanie Griffin
Source: Bahamas Elections

=== Proportionality ===
The table below presents the proportionality of parliamentary seats won in the 2012 election, as measured by the Gallagher index. This election yielded an index score of 24.28, indicating a highly disproportionate outcome that strongly favoured the PLP while being significantly disadvantageous for others.

Gallagher index for the 2012 Bahamian general election
Party	% of votes	seats won	% of seats	difference	difference squared
PLP	48.62	29	76.32	27.70	767.29
FNM	42.09	9	23.68	(18.41)	338.93
DNA	8.48	0	0	(8.48)	71.91
Other	0.81	0	0	(0.81)	0.66
Total	100.00	38	100.00	(0.00)	1,178.79
Difference halved				589.395	
Square root				24.28	
