= 2002 Bahamian general election =

- 2 May 2002

All 40 seats in the House of Assembly 21 seats needed for a majority
- Registered: 144,758
- Turnout: 90.18% (▼2.99pp)
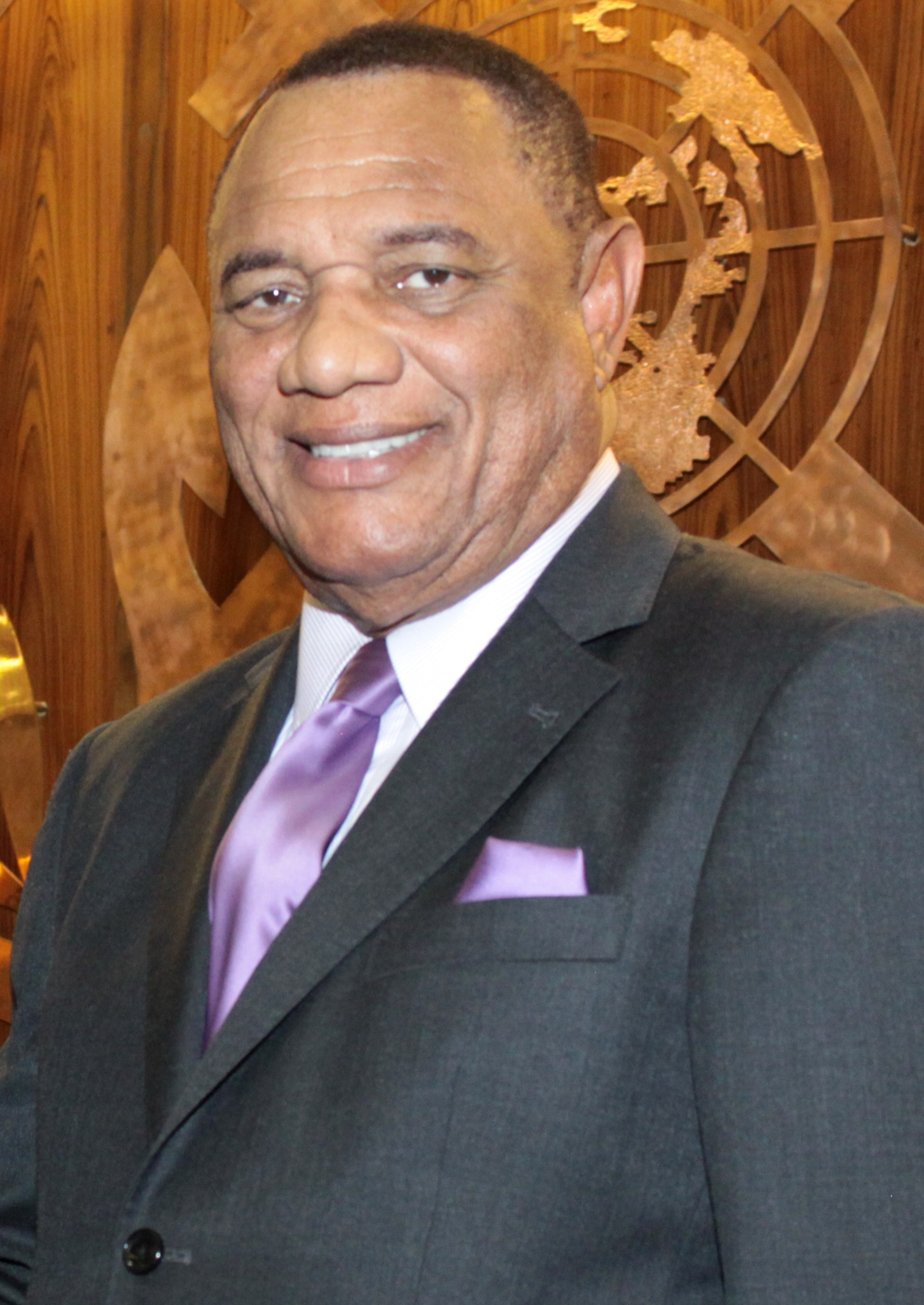

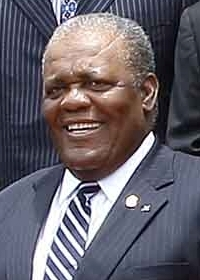
	First party	Second party
Leader	Perry Christie	Hubert Ingraham
Party	PLP	FNM
Leader's seat	Centreville	North Abaco
Last election	41.90%, 6 seats	57.70%, 34 seats
Seats won	29	7
Seat change	▲24	▼28
Popular vote	66,897	52,803
Percentage	51.78%	40.87%
Swing	▲6.88 pp	▼16.83 pp
Prime Minister before election
Hubert Ingraham
FNM
Elected Prime Minister
Perry Christie
PLP

General elections were held in the Bahamas on 2 May 2002. The opposition Progressive Liberal Party (PLP) won 29 of the 40 seats in the House of Assembly to defeat the governing Free National Movement (FNM). Voter turnout was 90%.

== Background ==
In the 1992 election the Free National Movement came to power after defeating the then governing Progressive Liberal Party. Their leader Hubert Ingraham served as prime minister from 1992 until he announced his intention to step down as prime minister at the 2002 general election. Tommy Turnquest was then narrowly elected as the next leader of the FNM and would be the party's candidate for prime minister at the election.

The FNM government suffered a setback in February 2002 when an attempt to amend the constitution was rejected in a referendum. The referendum had been contested between the two main parties after the PLP reversed their earlier support and campaigned against the changes.

== Campaign ==
A record 132 candidates stood in the election for the 40 seats in the House of Assembly that were being contested. These were from 4 political parties and included 40 from the governing FNM and 37 from the opposition PLP. As well as the candidates from political parties there were also 14 independents.

The FNM defended their time in government, pointing to the strong economic growth over the period and the large amount of foreign investment that had come into the Bahamas. Their new leader Tommy Turnquest pledged to continue as they had been doing under Hubert Ingraham. However the opposition PLP criticised the FNM as being out of touch and attacked them for being too quick to comply with the OECD's Financial Action Task Force on Money Laundering. The PLP said that they would help the less well off and develop islands they said had been neglected by the FNM.

Both parties made fierce attacks on each other with the FNM reminding voters of the scandals over drug money that had led to the PLP losing power back in 1992. Meanwhile, the PLP accused the FNM's Tommy Turnquest of corruption over the awarding of government contracts. Despite the harsh campaign, outside commentators expected little change in policies whichever party was successful in the election.

There was no trouble on election day, with schools and liquor stores being closed and polling stations seeing a high turnout.

== Results ==
The results saw the PLP win over half of the vote and 29 of the seats in the House of Assembly. The FNM conceded defeat, with their leader Tommy Turnquest being one of several cabinet ministers to lose their seats. The leader of the PLP, Perry Christie, became the new prime minister of the Bahamas on 3 May 2002.

Party	Votes	%	Seats	+/–
Progressive Liberal Party	66,897	51.78	29	+24
Free National Movement	52,803	40.87	7	−28
Coalition + Labour	2,793	2.16	0	New
Bahamas Democratic Movement	414	0.32	0	New
Bahamas Constitution Party	12	0.01	0	New
Our Survivors	10	0.01	0	New
Independents	6,272	4.85	4	+4
Total	129,201	100.00	40	0
Valid votes	129,201	98.97		
Invalid/blank votes	1,344	1.03		
Total votes	130,545	100.00		
Registered voters/turnout	144,758	90.18		
Source: Caribbean Elections

=== Elected MPs ===
Number	Name	Party	Island (area)	Constituency	Ethnicity
1	Frank Smith	Progressive Liberal Party	New Providence East	St. Thomas More	Black
2	Pierre Dupuch	Independent	New Providence East	St. Margaret	White
3	Brent Symonette	Free National Movement	New Providence East	Montagu	White
4	Fred Mitchell	Progressive Liberal Party	New Providence East	Fox Hill	Black
5	Melanie Griffin	Progressive Liberal Party	New Providence East	Yamacraw	Black
6	Malcolm Adderley	Progressive Liberal Party	New Providence East	Elizabeth	Black
7	Sidney Stubbs	Progressive Liberal Party	New Providence East	Holy Cross	Black
8	Alfred Sears	Progressive Liberal Party	New Providence West	Fort Charlotte	Black
9	Neville Wisdom	Progressive Liberal Party	New Providence West	Delaporte	Black
10	John Carey	Progressive Liberal Party	New Providence West	Carmichael	Black
11	Micheal Halkitis	Progressive Liberal Party	New Providence West	Adelaide	Black
12	Leslie Miller	Progressive Liberal Party	New Providence West	Blue Hills	Black
13	Keod Smith	Progressive Liberal Party	New Providence West	Mount Moriah	Black
14	Bradley Roberts	Progressive Liberal Party	New Providence South	Bain Town and Grants Town	Black
15	Perry Christie	Progressive Liberal Party	New Providence South	Farm Road	Black
16	Cynthia A. Pratt	Progressive Liberal Party	New Providence South	St. Cecilia	Black
17	Glennys Hanna-Martin	Progressive Liberal Party	New Providence South	Englerston	Black
18	Ron Pinder	Progressive Liberal Party	New Providence South	Marathon	Black
19	Veronica Owens	Progressive Liberal Party	New Providence South	Garden Hills	Black
20	Shane Gibson	Progressive Liberal Party	New Providence South	Golden Gates	Black
21	Tennyson Wells	Independent	New Providence South	Bamboo Town	Black
22	Kenyatta Gibson	Progressive Liberal Party	New Providence South	Kennedy	Black
23	Allyson Gibson	Progressive Liberal Party	New Providence South	Pinewood	Black
24	Agatha Marchelle	Progressive Liberal Party	New Providence South	South Beach	Black
25	Obie Wilchcombe	Progressive Liberal Party	Grand Bahama	West End and Bimini	Black
26	Ann Perecentie	Progressive Liberal Party	Grand Bahama	Pineridge	Black
27	Kenneth Russell	Free National Movement	Grand Bahama	High Rock	Black
28	Lindy Russell	Free National Movement	Grand Bahama	Eight Mile Rock	Black
29	Neko Grant	Free National Movement	Grand Bahama	Lucaya	Black
30	Pleasant Bridgewater	Progressive Liberal Party	Grand Bahama	Marco City	Black
31	Vincent Peet	Progressive Liberal Party	Andros	North Andros and Berry Islands	Black
32	Whitney Bastian	Independent	Andros	Mangrove Cay and South Andros	Black
33	Hubert Ingraham	Free National Movement	Abaco	North Abaco	Black
34	Robert Sweeting	Free National Movement	Abaco	South Abaco	White
35	Alvin Smith	Free National Movement	Eleuthera	North Eleuthera, Spanish Wells and Harbour Island	Black
36	Oswald Ingram	Progressive Liberal Party	Eleuthera	South Eleuthera	Black
37	Philip Davis	Progressive Liberal Party	Cat Island	Cat Island, Rum Cay & San Salvador	Black
38	Anthony Moss	Progressive Liberal Party	Exuma	Rolleville	Black
39	Larry Cartwright	Independent	Long Island	Long and Ragged Island	White
40	Alfred Gray	Progressive Liberal Party	Mayaguana, Inagua, Crooked, Acklins, & Long Cay Islands	MICAL	Black
Source: bahamasb2b.com
