= North Eleuthera (Bahamas Parliament constituency) =

Bahamas parliamentary constituency

- Constituency
- North Eleuthera on a map of the 2021 election
- District: North Eleuthera
- Electorate: 2,921 (2011); 3,515 (2021)

Current constituency
- Seats: 1
- Party: Progressive Liberal Party
- Member: Sylvannus Petty

North Eleuthera is a parliamentary constituency represented in the House of Assembly of the Bahamas. It elects one member of parliament (MP) using the first past the post electoral system. It has been represented by Sylvannus Petty from the Progressive Liberal Party since 2021.

== Geography ==
The constituency comprises the district of North Eleuthera.

== Members of Parliament ==
Election	Parliament	Candidate	Party
1997	9th Bahamian Parliament	Alvin Smith	Free National Movement
2002	10th Bahamian Parliament	Alvin Smith	Free National Movement
2007	11th Bahamian Parliament	Alvin Smith	Free National Movement
2012	12th Bahamian Parliament	Theo Neilly	Free National Movement
2017	13th Bahamian Parliament	Howard Mackey	Free National Movement
2021	14th Bahamian Parliament	Sylvannus Petty	Progressive Liberal Party
2026	15th Bahamian Parliament	Sylvannus Petty	Progressive Liberal Party

== Election results ==
2021
Party	Candidate	Votes	%	±%
PLP	Sylvannus Petty	1,234	51.12	▲7.12
FNM	Howard Mackey	1,140	47.22	▼7.78
Grand Commonwealth Party	Dwight Cambridge	21	0.87	
United Coalition Movement	Mcclain Pinder	19	0.79	
Turnout		2,414	68.68	
PLP gain from FNM				

== See also ==
- Constituencies of the Bahamas
