= Renward Wells =

Bahamian sprinter

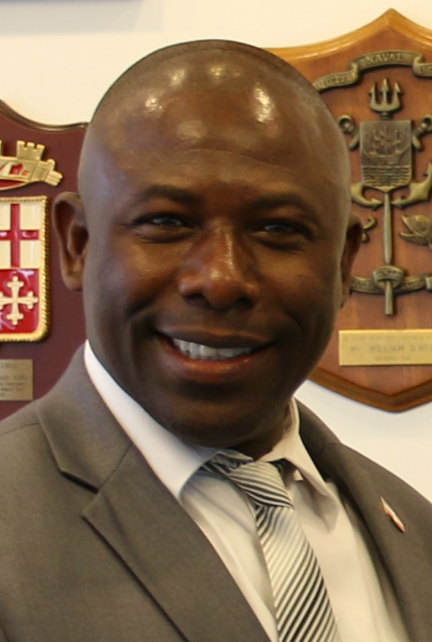
- Wells in 2019

Minister of Health
- In office July 20, 2020 – September 2020
- Prime Minister: Hubert Minnis
- Preceded by: Duane Sands
- Succeeded by: Michael Darville

Minister of Transport and Local Government
- In office July 2018 – July 20, 2020
- Prime Minister: Hubert Minnis
- Preceded by: Frankie Campbell
- Succeeded by: JoBeth Coleby-Davis (2023)

Minister of Agriculture and Marine Resources
- In office May 2017 – July 2018
- Succeeded by: Michael Pintard

Member of Parliament for Bamboo Town
- In office May 2012 – 2021
- Preceded by: Branville McCartney
- Succeeded by: Patricia Deveaux

Personal details
- Born: 23 July 1970 (age 56) Nassau, Bahamas
- Party: Free National Movement (2015–present)
- Other political affiliations: Progressive Liberal Party (2011–2015); National Development Party (2008–2011)
- Spouse: Sarah Wells
- Children: 6
- Sports career
- Height: 1.65 m (5 ft 5 in)
- Weight: 70 kg (11 st 0 lb; 154 lb)
Medal record
Men's Athletics
Representing Bahamas
CARIFTA Games Youth (U17)
Bronze medal – third place	1986 Les Abymes	400 m
|}

Renward Ricardo Wells (born 23 February 1970) is a Bahamian politician and retired sprinter who has been the Member of Parliament (MP) for Bamboo Town from 2012 to 2021. In sprinting, he specialized in the 100 metres.

He competed at the Carifta Games in 1986 in Guadeloupe where he won a bronze medal in the 400 meters. He also competed in Carifta Jamaica 1988 and in Barbados in 1989.

In May 1989 Wells helped the Boise State University Broncos to their first Track and field Big Sky Conference title in 22 years.

He competed at the Olympic Games in 1996 and 2000 and the World Championships in 1995, 1997, 1999 and 2001 without reaching the finals.

His personal best time was 10.18 seconds, achieved at the 1995 World Championships in Gothenburg. Wells also co-holds the Bahamian national record in the 4 x 100 metres relay, achieved with teammates Dominic Demeritte, Iram Lewis and Andrew Tynes. Wells in 1994 ran one of the fastest times ever recorded under any conditions in the 200 meters

Wells was coached From 1996 to 2001 by the famed coach Steve Riddick in Virginia Beach, Virginia.

== Early life ==
Renward Ricardo Wells was born in Nassau, Bahamas. His parents William Wells and Leoma Flowers were never married. In 1971 at age one, Wells went to live with his father's parents in Deadman's Cay on Long Island, Bahamas. He left in 1973 and was sent to live with his mother's parents on the Island of South Andros in the settlement of Driggs' Hill. At that time in The Bahamas, neither of those islands possessed electrical installations or modern sewage systems, so Wells grew up in spartan conditions assisting his grandfather, Bertram Flowers, fishing and grandmother, Natalee Flowers with subsistence agriculture farming. In December 1979, he was reunited with his mother and her husband-Yorick Smith in Freeport, Bahamas on the island of Grand Bahama.

== Education ==
Wells attended Driggs Hill All Age School, Bartlette Hill Primary School, Eight Mile Rock High School and RM Bailey Senior High School. He was an active student leader, avid reader and athlete. He graduated at the top of his class in 1987 in the science stream and was elected by students and teachers to be school President.

With the aid of an athletic scholarships in 1988, Wells attended Boise State University in Idaho. Wells left Boise State in May 1989 for an athletic scholarship to the University of California, Los Angeles, U.C.L.A. However, Boise State refused to sign his release letter required for transfer by the NCAA, so Wells had to sit out an entire year before he was able to attend UCLA. In June 1992, Wells again made another university switch leaving UCLA to attend, on an athletic scholarship, Oral Roberts University. While at Oral Roberts, he began dating Sarah Adermann. Sarah competed in the high jump event for the Oral Roberts University's track team. Renward and Sarah married in June 1993.

Wells graduated from Oral Roberts in 1995 with a Bachelor of Science degree in mechanical engineering. While at Oral Roberts, Wells taught himself to play the guitar and has written a number of messianic Christian worship songs.

In September 1998, Wells enrolled in Regent University Law School and Divinity School. He left Regent University in December 2000 and moved to his wife's hometown Coon Rapids, Minnesota, to concentrate on his growing family.

== Post athletic career ==
In September 2003, Renward moved back to The Bahamas and began working for The Government of The Bahamas in the Ministry of Works and Transport as a mechanical engineer.

Since returning home to The Bahamas, he has become politically active, discussing and debating many social issues and has become a member of the Executive Steering Committee of the National Development Party (NDP), a political party he was instrumental in helping to form in 2008. He became the deputy chairman of the executive steering committee in October 2009 and chairman on 5 April 2010.

The NDP was the first party in The Bahamas to allow every member of the party the right to vote for the leadership team and officers of the party. The NDP held a nationally televised debate between the nominees for the leadership on 17 November 2010. On 29 November 2010, Wells was elected the first leader of the National Development Party at the party's first convention. In 2011, however, he was one of several NDP members who defected to the Progressive Liberal Party, following a schism in the party as the new Democratic National Alliance began drawing away some of the NDP's support.

Wells was elected to the Parliament of The Bahamas as a PLP member in the 2012 election for the Constituency of Bamboo Town. In the Four way election (Renward Wells PLP, Cassius Stuart FNM, Branville Mccartney DNA, Craig Butler IN) Wells won with 39.2% of the overall vote. He was appointed as the Parliamentary Secretary in the Ministry of Works & Urban Development. Wells broke with PLP in 2015 by crossing the Floor in Parliament to join the then opposition party, The Free National Movement, The FNM. Wells Ran as a candidate for the Free National Movement for the Bamboo Town Constituency in the 10 May 2017 General Elections and won overwhelmingly with 54% of the vote.

On 15 May 2017 Wells was named the Minister of Agriculture and Marine Resources in the cabinet of Prime Minister Hubert Minnis. Wells was also appointed by the Prime Minister as the Leader of Government Business in The Parliament. On 4 July 2018, Wells was appointed as the Minister of Transport and Local Government.

Wells has publicly supported the Bahamas becoming a republic.

He will be a candidate in the 2026 Bahamian general election.

== Personal life ==
Wells is married to Sarah Wells and the couple have six children; Sethren, Sasha, Sierra, Soren, Soraya and Sakarren. Sarah is a stay-at-home mom and the Wells' children are all homeschooled.
