= 1997 Bahamian general election =

- 14 March 1997

All 40 seats in the House of Assembly 21 seats needed for a majority
- Registered: 129,946
- Turnout: 93.17%
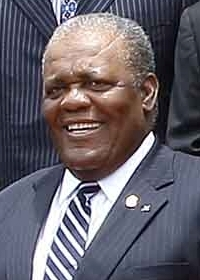

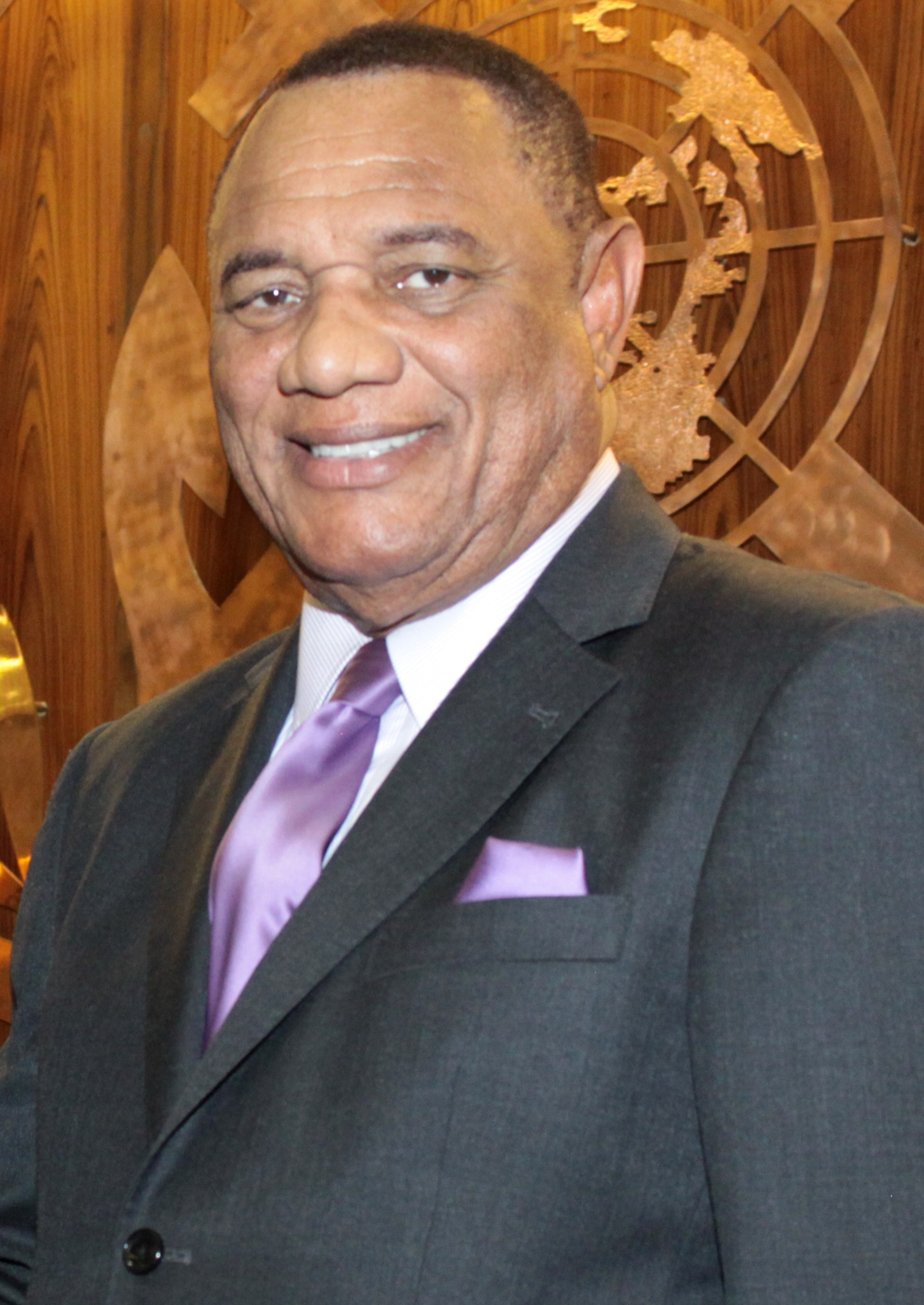
| | First party | Second party |
|---|---|---|
| Leader | Hubert Ingraham | Perry Christie |
| Party | FNM | PLP |
| Leader's seat | North Abaco | Centreville |
| Last election | 55.15%, 33 seats | 44.85%, 16 seats |
| Seats won | 34 | 6 |
| Seat change | ▲1 | ▼10 |
| Popular vote | 68,766 | 49,932 |
| Percentage | 57.70% | 41.90% |
| Swing | ▲2.55 pp | ▼2.95 pp |
Prime Minister before election
Hubert Ingraham
FNM
Elected Prime Minister
Hubert Ingraham
FNM

General elections were held in the Bahamas on 14 March 1997. The result was a victory for the Free National Movement, which won 34 of the 40 seats. Hubert Ingraham was sworn in for a second term as Prime Minister on 18 March.

The 1997 elections were the last time that a Prime Minister was re-elected for a second consecutive term until 2026.

== Results ==
| Party | Votes | % | Seats | +/– |
|---|---|---|---|---|
| Free National Movement | 68,766 | 57.70 | 34 | +1 |
| Progressive Liberal Party | 49,932 | 41.90 | 6 | –10 |
| Independents | 475 | 0.40 | 0 | New |
| Total | 119,173 | 100.00 | 40 | –9 |
| Valid votes | 119,173 | 98.43 | | |
| Invalid/blank votes | 1,900 | 1.57 | | |
| Total votes | 121,073 | 100.00 | | |
| Registered voters/turnout | 129,946 | 93.17 | | |
Source: Caribbean Elections

=== Elected MPs ===
| Number | Name | Party | Island (area) | Constituency | Ethnicity |
|---|---|---|---|---|---|
| 1 | Sylvia Scriven | Free National Movement | New Providence East | St. Margaret | Black |
| 2 | Pierre Dupuch | Free National Movement | New Providence East | Shirlea | White |
| 3 | William Allen | Free National Movement | New Providence East | Montagu | Black |
| 4 | Juanianne Dorsett | Free National Movement | New Providence East | Fox Hill | Black |
| 5 | Janet Bostwick | Free National Movement | New Providence East | Yamacraw | Black |
| 6 | Lestor Turnquest | Free National Movement | New Providence East | Malcolm Creek | Black |
| 7 | Carl Bethell | Free National Movement | New Providence East | Holy Cross | Black |
| 8 | Zhivargo Laing | Free National Movement | New Providence West | Fort Charlotte | Black |
| 9 | Watkins Floyd | Free National Movement | New Providence West | Delaporte | Black |
| 10 | Anthony Rolle | Free National Movement | New Providence West | Carmichael | Black |
| 11 | Frank Watson | Free National Movement | New Providence West | Adelaide | Black |
| 12 | Dion Faulkes | Free National Movement | New Providence West | Blue Hills | Black |
| 13 | Orville Turnquest | Free National Movement | New Providence West | Mount Moriah | Black |
| 14 | Gregory Williams | Free National Movement | New Providence West | Bain Town | Black |
| 15 | Bradley Roberts | Progressive Liberal Party | New Providence South | Grants Town | Black |
| 16 | Perry Christie | Progressive Liberal Party | New Providence South | Centreville | Black |
| 17 | Cynthia A. Pratt | Progressive Liberal Party | New Providence South | St. Cecilia | Black |
| 18 | Philip Galanis | Progressive Liberal Party | New Providence South | Englerston | Black |
| 19 | Algernon Allen | Free National Movement | New Providence South | Marathon | Black |
| 20 | Italia Johnson | Free National Movement | New Providence South | Garden Hills | Black |
| 21 | Theresa Moxey-Ingraham | Free National Movement | New Providence South | Golden Gates | Black |
| 22 | Tennyson Wells | Free National Movement | New Providence South | Bamboo Town | Black |
| 23 | Bernard Nottage | Progressive Liberal Party | New Providence South | Kennedy | Black |
| 24 | Michael Smith | Free National Movement | New Providence South | South Beach | Black |
| 25 | David Wallace | Free National Movement | Grand Bahama | West End and Bimini | Black |
| 26 | Cornelius A. Smith | Free National Movement | Grand Bahama | Pineridge | Black |
| 27 | Kenneth Russell | Free National Movement | Grand Bahama | High Rock | Black |
| 28 | Lindy Russell | Free National Movement | Grand Bahama | Eight Mile Rock | Black |
| 29 | Neko Grant | Free National Movement | Grand Bahama | Lucaya | Black |
| 30 | David Thompson | Free National Movement | Grand Bahama | Marco City | Black |
| 31 | Earl Deveaux | Free National Movement | Andros | North Andros and Berry Islands | Black |
| 32 | Lynden Pindling | Progressive Liberal Party | Andros | Mangrove Cay and South Andros | Black |
| 33 | Hubert Ingraham | Free National Movement | Abaco | North Abaco | Black |
| 34 | Robert Sweeting | Free National Movement | Abaco | South Abaco | White |
| 35 | Alvin Smith | Free National Movement | Eleuthera | North Eleuthera, Spanish Wells and Harbour Island | Black |
| 36 | Anthony Miller | Free National Movement | Eleuthera | South Eleuthera | Black |
| 37 | James Miller | Free National Movement | Cat Island | Cat Island, Rum Cay & San Salvador | Black |
| 38 | Elliot Lockheart | Free National Movement | Exuma | Exuma | Black |
| 39 | James Knowles | Free National Movement | Long Island | Long and Ragged Island | White |
| 40 | Vernon Symonette | Free National Movement | Mayaguana, Inagua, Crooked, Acklins, & Long Cay Islands | MICAL | Black |
Source: Election Passport
