= Golden Isles (Bahamas Parliament constituency) =

- Constituency
- Golden Isles is 2 on this map of the 2021 election
- District: New Providence
- Electorate: 4,107 (2011)

Current constituency
- Seats: 1
- Party: Progressive Liberal Party
- Member: Darron Pickstock

Golden Isles is a parliamentary constituency represented in the House of Assembly of the Bahamas. It elects one member of parliament (MP) using the first past the post electoral system. It has been represented by Darron Pickstock from the Progressive Liberal Party since the 2025 by-election. It was previously held by Vaughn Miller He was originally elected for the Free National Movement.

== Geography ==
The constituency comprises the Elizabeth Estates area of Nassau, the capital and largest city of the Bahamas.

== Members of Parliament ==
Election	Parliament	Candidate	Party
2007	11th Bahamian Parliament	Charles Maynard	Free National Movement
2012	12th Bahamian Parliament	Michael Halkitis	Progressive Liberal Party
2017	13th Bahamian Parliament	Vaughn Miller	Free National Movement
2021	14th Bahamian Parliament	Vaughn Miller	Progressive Liberal Party
2025	14th Bahamian Parliament	Darron Pickstock	Progressive Liberal Party
2026	15th Bahamian Parliament	Darron Pickstock	Progressive Liberal Party

== Election results ==
2021
Party	Candidate	Votes	%	±%
PLP	Vaughn Miller	2,471	50.48	▲16.48
FNM	Brian Brown	1,844	37.67	▼18.33
COI	Don King	346	7.07	
DNA	Antione Ferguson	123	2.51	▼6.49
United Coalition Movement	Caron Shepherd	62	1.27	
Independent	Alexander Kemp	32	0.65	▼6.49
Grand Commonwealth Party	Eric Bess	17	0.35	
Turnout		4,895	66.23	
PLP hold				

== See also ==
- Constituencies of the Bahamas
