= Edison Key =

Bahamian politician and lawyer

Edison McGinnis Key (born abt. 1939) is a Bahamian politician and former Member of Parliament. He is best known for representing Central and South Abaco as a Member of Parliament. He served in various capacities during his 40-year political career, including two terms as a Senator and as chairman of the Bahamas Telecommunications Corporation (BaTelCo) and chair of the Bahamas Agricultural and Industrial Corporation (BAIC).

== Early life ==
Key was born on 18 May 1938 in Abaco, Bahamas, the son of Bunyan and Lillian Key.

== London delegation ==
In 1973, as the Bahamas prepared for independence from Britain, there was a movement by some residents of the Abaco Islands to secede from the rest of the Bahamas (and remain under British rule or become an independent territory). Key was one of five Abacoans, who formed a delegation to London, to counter claims that all Abacoans wished to secede.

The separatist movement, which garnered some international attention, ultimately failed and Abaco became part of an independent Bahamas.

== Political career ==
=== PLP years ===
Key was first elected to Parliament in 1977 for the Progressive Liberal Party (PLP). Tens years later, in the 1987 General Election, he lost the South Abaco race to Fred Gottlieb.

Subsequently, in 1992, the Abaco Islands were divided into three constituencies. Key ran against Gottlieb in the new Marsh Harbour electorate. The election saw Key returning to Parliament as he bested his opponent. However, the Opposition Free National Movement (FNM) party won the national election ending twenty-five years of PLP rule.

In 2005, Key resigned as a PLP senator and subsequently left the party. In his resignation letter, Edison Key reflected on his 34-year allegiance to the PLP, despite facing hostility due to his race. He accused the PLP government of the day of ostracising him after he exposed a potential corruption scheme.

=== FNM defection ===
Later that year, Key joined the Free National Movement marking a significant turning point in his political career.

In 2006, it was announced that Key would run in the 2007 general election as the FNM candidate for South Abaco. In the election, Key won and returned to Parliament and was appointed chairman of the Bahamas Agricultural and Industrial Corporation.

He also successfully retained his seat in the 2012 general election, despite the FNM's defeat in a landslide victory by the PLP.

In 2015, at the age of 76, Edison Key announced his intention to retire from politics in 2017, concluding a 40-year-long career as a parliamentarian. He expressed a desire to focus on his personal life, in particular to spend more time with his wife. In December 2016, Key accused FNM officials of betraying him by holding secret meetings to select another candidate for his electorate. He and six other MPs also wrote a letter to the Governor-General expressing no-confidence in their party leader, Hubert Minnis, as Leader of the Opposition.

=== Return to the PLP ===
In 2017, Key changed his allegiance yet again and re-joined the Progressive Liberal Party.
