= Queen's College, Nassau =

Private primary and secondary school

Coordinates: 25.0666°N 77.3149°W

- Nassau; The Bahamas

Information
- Established: 1890; 136 years ago
- Head teacher: Rev Henry Knowles
- Website: https://www.qchenceforth.com/

Queen's College (QC) is a coeducational institution located in Nassau, Bahamas, operating under the auspices of the Bahamas Conference of the Methodist Church. Founded in 1890, Queen's College is the oldest private school in the Bahamas.

== History ==
Queen's College was the successor to the Bahamas Wesleyan Propriety Institution, which had opened in 1871.

Queen's College opened on 6 January 1890 after a committee had been formed to establish the school and Victoria Hall was built to house the new school. Mr. S. B. Wilson was recruited from Harrogate College, England, to be the school's principal, with his wife to head up the girls' department of the school.

The school operated under the auspices of the Methodist Missionary Society. In its first year, the school started with 67 students. By 1947–48, the school's enrolment had increased to 335 pupils.

By the late 1960s, the school's population had grown to more than 2,000 students.

== Principals ==
From 1890 to 1925, the school continued under the guidance of S. B. Wilson and his successors, including Rev. W. J. P. White (c 1902) and Rev. Leonard Edge (1903–1908).

In 1925, Rev Richard P. Dyer took up the appointment as headmaster, a position he which held until 1959. Dyer was succeeded by Geoffrey Litherland (1959–64), Neville Stewart (1964–71), and Hayden Middleton (1971–79).

The first Bahamian administrator of Queen's College, Yvonne Noronha, was appointed vice principal of the college and headmistress of the primary school in 1978. This was followed by the appointment of Charles Sweeting in 1979. Sweeting served as principal until 1993.

Vice Principal Philip Cash was appointed principal in 1993 and served until he died in June 1997. In November 1997, Andrea Gibson became the first woman principal and served until 2019. Virginia Minnis was appointed head of the early learning centre in September 1999 and was the first Bahamian to serve in this post.

The school's current principal is Rev Henry Knowles, who has held the position since 2019.

== Current structure ==
Queen's College consists of three sections: the early learning centre, a primary school and a high school. The school offers Advanced Placement courses, A+ certification, Advanced Subsidiary courses, SAT II course, and MOUS (Microsoft Office User Specialist Certification) certificates.

== Sports ==
The Comets, the school sporting team, has won awards in basketball, volleyball, swimming, track & field, and soccer. For years, Queen's College has placed second in the Bahamas Association of Independent Secondary Schools (BAISS) Track and Field Championship. In 2015, the Comets secured their first victory over the St. Augustine's College (SAC) Big Red Machines, who were on a 20+ year winning streak.

== Administration ==
As of 2025:

- Principal: Rev. Henry Knowles
- Vice Principal, Head of High School: Kadian Hanson-Wells
- Deputy Head High School (Curriculum): Shellen Wint-Grant
- Deputy Head High School (Administration): Krista McIntosh
- Head of Primary Years: Devona Knowles
- Head of Foundation Years: Joiclyn Taylor

== House system ==
Queen's College has four houses: Dyer, Heath, King, and Rogers. This system is used primarily for student classification in sporting events and as a merit system up to the high school level. It is then used to place students into home room classes, where students remain until graduation. It is also used to decide which students go to BAISS.

House	House Colour
Dyer	
Heath	
King	
Rogers	

== Extra-curricular activities ==
Clubs and societies include but is not limited to:

- The SPARC (Students Pursuing Advanced Rigorous Courses) Programme
- The Student Christian Movement
- The Student Representative Council
- The Anchor Club
- The Key Club
- The Junior Cooperative Credit Union
- The Interact Club
- The Debating Society (encompassing The Model United Nations debate)
- The People to People International Student Chapter
- The Teacher Cadets Club
- The Modern Languages Club
- The Governor General's Youth Awards
- The Queen in Me Club
- The Drama Club
- The Chess Club
- The Guitar Club
- Feeding the 5000
- Cheerleading
- Band
- French Praise Team
- School Choir
- Junkanoo Squad

Through Queen's College's extra-curricular involvement, students have become involved with organizations such as Resources and Education for Autism and Related Challenges (REACH), the AIDS Foundation of the Bahamas, and the Special Olympics Committee of the Bahamas.

Students of the college have volunteered in improving the living conditions and recognition of hurricane victims.

== Notable alumni ==
- Keva Eldon Bethel, educator
- Culture, rapper/musician
- Jackie Edwards, long jumper
- Durward Knowles, Olympic sailor
- Leonard Knowles, first Chief Justice of the Bahamas
- Glenys Hanna Martin, member of Parliament of the Bahamas for Englerston and chairwoman of the Progressive Liberal Party
- Allison Martlew, musician
- Phenton Neymour, member of Parliament of the Bahamas for South Beach and Minister of State for the Environment
- Mychal Thompson, NBA basketball player
- Obie Wilchcombe, member of Parliament of the Bahamas for West End and Bimini
