= Frederick Gottlieb =

Bahamian politician and lawyer

Fred Gottlieb is a Bahamian lawyer and former Member of Parliament.

== Early life ==
Gottlieb was born in April 1950 in Grand Bahama, Bahamas to Dr. Ejnar and Mrs. Owanta Gottlieb.

Gottlieb's father was a German immigrant who had fled Nazi Germany to England and had been hired by the Abaco Lumber Company.

== Political career ==
Gottlieb became an active member of the Free National Movement party (FNM) at an early age.

In the 1987 General Election, he defeated PLP incumbent Edison Key to win the electorate of South Abaco to become a Member of Parliament for the Opposition FNM.

For the following election, in 1992, Abaco area was divided into three constituencies. Gottlieb again ran against Edison Key, this time for the Marsh Harbour seat. Edison Key narrowly bested Gottlieb in the contest but Gottlieb's FNM party won the national election ending twenty-five years of PLP rule.

After his loss, Gottlieb focused more on his law practice although he is still involved in the party, speaking at party conventions and local party rallies.

== Board memberships ==
Gottlieb has served as chair of numerous government boards, including the boards of Water and Sewage Company, Bahamasair, the Broadcasting Corporation of the Bahamas, and Bahamas Electricity Corporation (B.E.C).

== Awards and honours ==
Gottlieb was appointed an Ordinary Member of the Order of the British Empire in the Queen's New Years Honours of 2021 for services to politics and to industry.
