= List of National Assembly constituencies of the Bahamas =

House of Assembly of the Bahamas
- 15th Bahamian Parliament

History
- Founded: 4 March 1729; 297 years ago
- Seats: 41

Elections
- Voting system: First past the post
- Last election: 12 May 2026

Meeting place
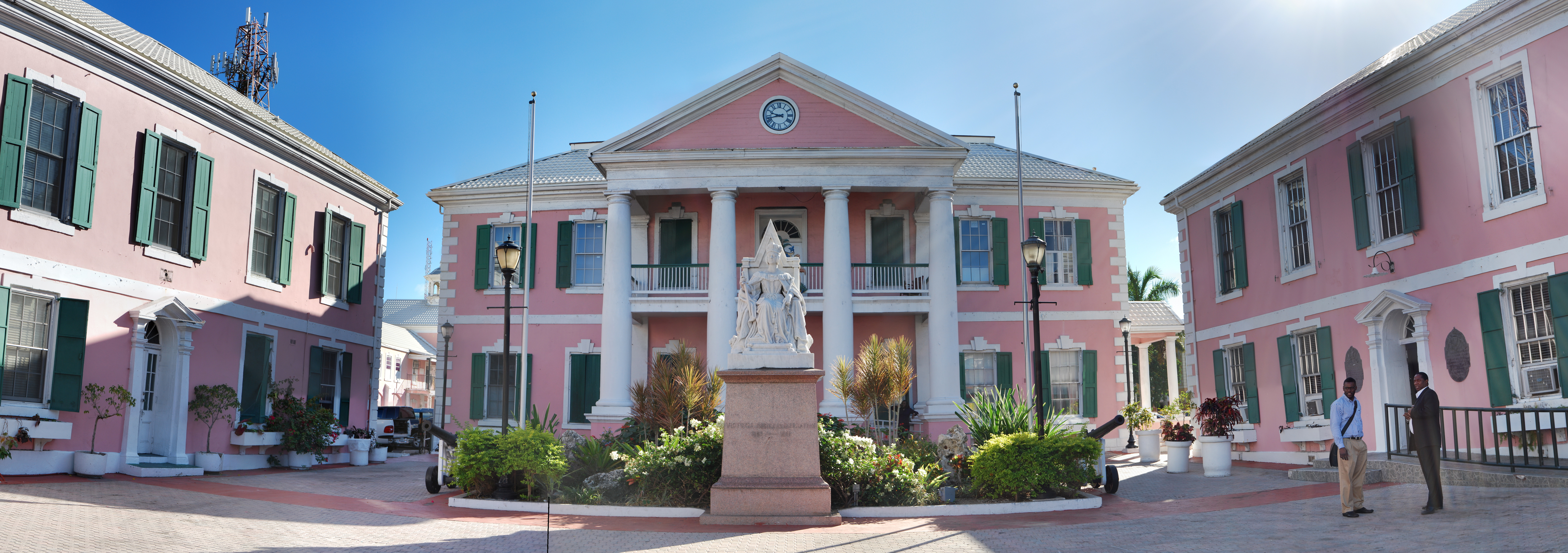
- Bahamian Parliament, Nassau, the Bahamas

Location of the Bahamas within the Western Hemisphere

The Bahamas House of Assembly is the lower house of the bicameral legislature of the Bahamas, an island country in the Caribbean. It is housed at the Bahamian Parliament Building in Nassau, the national capital. The current Assembly was elected by the general election held on 12 May 2026. The Assembly has 41 single-member constituencies and it uses the first-past-the-post system for elections. The Members of Parliament (MPs) serve five-year terms.

The National Assembly's origins can be traced back to 1729 when a Representative Assembly was set up for what was then a British colony. It was formed with 24 members (16 for New Providence, and four each for Harbour Island and Eleuthera). The first election after the country got independence from the United Kingdom was in 1977, when it had 38 constituencies. Since then, it has had a varying number of constituencies in the assembly. For the 1987 and the 1992 elections, it had 49 constituencies.

The current constituencies are based on the recommendations of the Constituency Commission in 2026. The commission conducts a review of the electoral boundaries every five years and makes recommendations to ensure that there is parity of numbers in each constituency. It suggests that each constituency have around 5,000 voters with a margin of 500. During boundary review, the commission tries to keep constituencies roughly the same size while considering other factors like "the needs of sparsely populated areas as well as geographic conditions". The constituency of MICAL is the smallest considering the number of voters (1,392), while Golden Isles is the largest with 7,391 voters.

The Constituencies Commission was newly appointed in 2024 to begin another review of the electoral boundaries in preparation for the next general election. By late 2025 government and media reports indicated that the commission was considering changes to several large or sparsely populated constituencies, including MICAL, Killarney, Golden Isles and West Grand Bahama & Bimini, and had proposed creating two new constituencies by splitting Killarney and West Grand Bahama and Bimini. Two new constituencies have been created for the 2026 Bahamian general election: Bimini and Berry Islands and St James. The constituency of North Andros and Berry Islands has been renamed as North Andros.

== Constituencies ==
Constituencies of the Bahamian National Assembly
Constituency	Electorate (2026)
Bain Town and Grants Town	4,504
Bamboo Town	6,178
Bimini and Berry Islands	2,510
Carmichael	6,372
Cat Island, Rum Cay & San Salvador	1,764
Central and South Abaco	4,609
Central and South Eleuthera	4,509
Central Grand Bahama	6,283
Centreville	4,807
East Grand Bahama	6,916
Elizabeth	6,174
Englerston	4,665
Fort Charlotte	6,802
Fox Hill	6,462
Freetown	4,688
Garden Hills	5,553
Golden Gates	5,798
Golden Isles	6,190
Killarney	6,858
Long Island	1,909
Mangrove Cay and South Andros	2,479
Marathon	5,366
Marco City	6,560
MICAL (Note: Mayaguana, Inagua, Crooked Island, Acklins, and Long Cay)	1,416
Mount Moriah	5,697
Nassau Village	5,934
North Abaco	4,456
North Andros	2,418
North Eleuthera	3,898
Pineridge	5,738
Pinewood	5,544
St. Anne's	6,027
St. Barnabas	4,855
St. James	6,461
Sea Breeze	6,319
South Beach	5,998
Southern Shores	5,601
Tall Pines	5,999
The Exumas and Ragged Island	4,136
West Grand Bahama	5,351
Yamacraw	5,460

== See also ==
- List of speakers of the House of Assembly of the Bahamas
- Local government in the Bahamas
