= O. Tommy Turnquest =

Bahamian politician

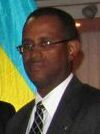
Turnquest in 2010

Orville Alton Thompson "Tommy" Turnquest, CBE (born 16 November 1959) is a Bahamian politician.

== Early life and education ==
Turnquest was born in 1959 in Nassau. He is the son of Sir Orville Turnquest, a former Governor-General, and Lady Edith Turnquest. He attended St Anne's High School in Nassau and Malvern College in England. He also attended the University of Western Ontario in Canada.

Before running for Parliament, Turnquest worked for the Canadian Imperial Bank of Commerce. He was the manager of the bank's East Bay Street Branch, Nassau, until the general election of August 1992.

== Political career ==
Turnquest began his political career in 1981. He had been instrumental in the reactivation of the Torchbearers, the youth wing of the Free National Movement (FNM) where he served as president for four years.

On 19 August 1992, he was elected the MP for Mount Moriah and then re-elected in the 1997 general elections. He has held many positions in the FNM, including Parliamentary Secretary for the Prime Minister's Office, Minister of State for Public Service and Labor (1995–1996), Minister of State for Public Works (1996–2000), Minister of Public Service (2000–2001) and Minister for Tourism (2001–2002). He was appointed Minister of Public Works on 20 March 1997.

After being voted leader-elect at a FNM party convention in August 2001, he looked likely to succeed Hubert Ingraham as the next prime minister of the Bahamas. However, at the 2002 general election, Turnquest lost his constituency seat to Keod Smith, the Progressive Liberal Party (PLP) candidate.

Turnquest continued to serve as leader of the FNM until 10 November 2005 and as Leader of the Opposition in the Senate until the 2007 general election, when he won back the seat of Mount Moriah, serving under Prime Minister Ingraham. He served as Minister of National Security from 2007 to 2012 in the cabinet of Hubert Ingraham.

Turnquest again lost his seat, this time to Arnold Forbes, the PLP candidate, in the 2012 general election held on 7 May 2012.
