= Sidney S. Collie =

Sidney S. Collie (born February 19, 1950, Mayaguana) is the ambassador to the United States from the Bahamas. Appointed October 1, 2017, he presented his credentials to President Donald Trump on November 29, 2017. Besides being ambassador to the United States of America, he is also permanent representative to the Organization of American States, (OAS) and non-resident ambassador to Mexico, Columbia and Malaysia.

== Biography ==
Collie graduated from Bahamas Teachers College (now University of the Bahamas). After working as a teacher for several years in the 1970s, he earned a bachelor's degree at the University of Miami on scholarship before earning a master's degree in English from Nova University in Florida.

He eventually left teaching to train to be a lawyer. He was admitted to the bar in November 1987 and opened a boutique law firm in 1993. His wife, Mavis Johnson-Collie, joined him in 2001, and they opened the Collie and Collie law firm.

Collie was consecrated a minister of the Gospel at the Zion South Beach Baptist Church in New Providence, The Bahamas, was one of the founding ministers of Abundant Grace Church, New Providence and chairman of the Bahamas Baptist Board of Education.

== Career in government ==
In 2007, Collie was appointed Minister of Lands and Local Government and from 2010 until 2012, was High Commissioner to CARICOM and Latin America.
