= Lawrence Cartwright =

Bahamian politician (born 1948)

Minister of Agriculture and Marine Resources
- In office 2007–2012

Member of the House of Assembly of the Bahamas for Long Island
- In office 2002–2012
- Succeeded by: Loretta Butler-Turner

Personal details
- Born: January 19, 1948 (age 78) Long Island, Bahamas
- Party: Free National Movement

Lawrence (Larry) Sheldon Cartwright (born January 19, 1948) is a Bahamian politician from the Free National Movement (FNM).

Cartwright completed a Bachelor of Arts degree in education administration at the University of the West Indies.

== Political career ==
Cartwright represented Long Island in the House of Assembly of the Bahamas from 2002 to 2012.

Following the 2007 Bahamian general election, he was appointed Minister of Agriculture and Marine Resources by Prime Minister Hubert Ingraham. He served from 2007 to 2012.
