= Pakesia Parker-Edgecombe =

Bahamian politician

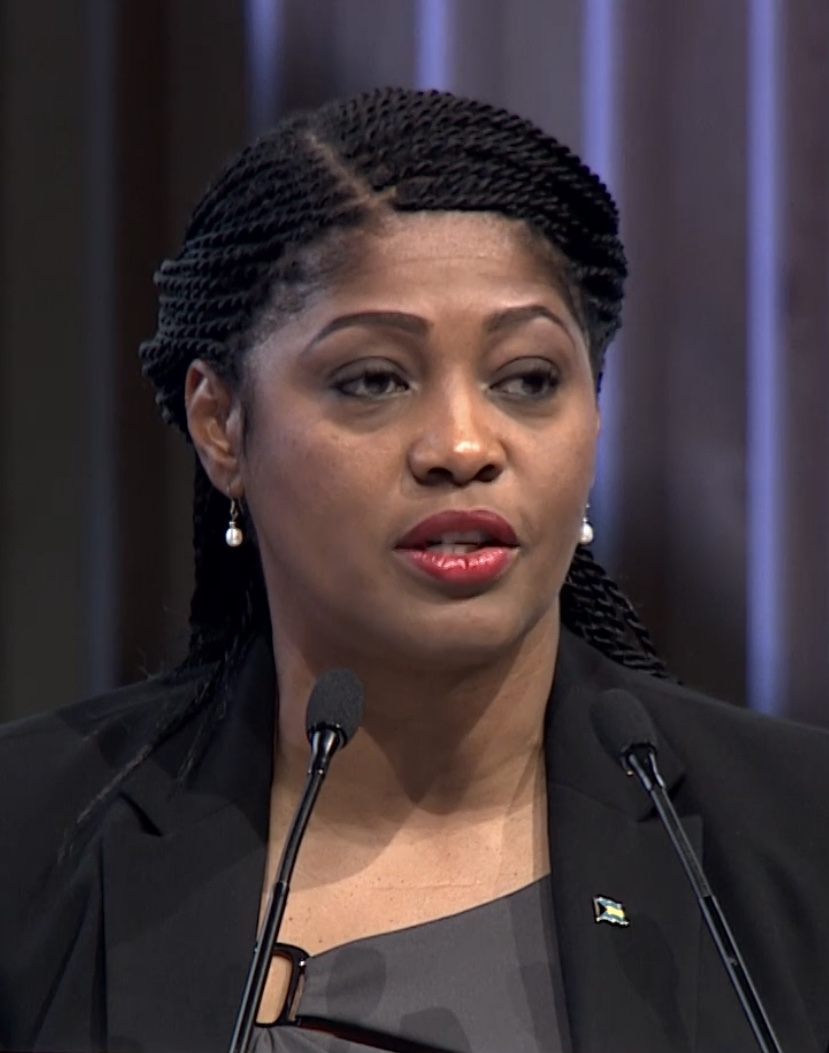
- Born: West End, Grand Bahama
- Education: Bethune-Cookman College, Nova Southeastern University
- Occupations: Journalist; politician
- Known for: Minister for Disaster Preparedness, Management and Reconstruction.

Pakesia Parker-Edgecombe or Pakesia Edgecombe; Pakesia Parker is a politician who was a government minister in The Bahamas. She was the first woman to represent her constituency and she was the only woman in the cabinet when she became the minister responsible for Disaster Preparedness, Management and Reconstruction.

== Life ==
Parker-Edgecombe was born in West End, Grand Bahama. Her mother was single and she was cared for by her mother and her grandmother. Her first work was to save money for her education which resulted not only in an honours degree in Mass Communications/Broadcast Journalism, but also a master's degree in Public Administration. Her qualifications led to a fifteen-year-long journalism career in the Broadcasting Corporation of the Bahamas. Her career included being an anchor on the news.

She was elected to parliament in the 2017 Bahamian general election. She was the first woman to represent West Grand Bahama and Bimini.

Parker-Edgecombe became a Parliamentary Secretary in the Office of the Prime Minister. On 2 March 2021 she was promoted to be a Minister of State. She was made responsible for Disaster Preparedness, Management and Reconstruction on the recommendation of the Prime Minister. She replaced Iram Lewis who was given another ministerial portfolio. Lanisha Rolle had resigned under a cloud the week before and she had been the only woman in the cabinet. It was alleged that Parker-Edgecombe had been chosen to be a minister because she was a woman. Parker-Edgecombe said this was just politics and she regretted that she was the only woman in cabinet, but there were others in the parliament.

In October 2023 she was not chosen as her party's candidate for what had been her constituency for one term. She had her position to Obie Wilchcombe and her party had chosen Bishop Ricardo Grant as their new candidate. She supported Bishop Ricardo Grant and said she was not disappointed.

== Private life ==
She is married to Trevor Edgecombe and they have two children.
