= 2002 Bahamian referendum =

A multiple referendum with five questions was held in the Bahamas on 27 February 2002. Voters were asked whether they approved of:

1. the removal of gender discrimination from the constitution
2. the creation of a national commission to monitor the standards of teachers
3. the creation of an independent parliamentary commissioner
4. the creation of an independent election boundaries commission
5. the increase of the retirement ages of judges from 60 to 65 (or 68 to 72 for appellate judges)

All five questions were rejected by voters, with between 62.8 and 70.9% voting against.

== Results ==
Question	For		Against		Invalid/ blank votes	Total
Question	Votes	%	Votes	%	Invalid/ blank votes	Total
Constitutional change	29,906	34.0	58,055	66.0		87,961
Teacher monitoring commission	32,892	37.2	55,627	62.8		88,519
Independent Parliamentary Commissioner	30,418	34.5	57,815	65.5		88,233
Independent election boundaries commission	30,903	35.0	57,291	65.0		88,194
Retirement ages of judges	25,018	29.1	60,838	70.9		85,856
Source: Nohlen
