= Vaughn Miller =

Bahamian politician (1960 or 1961 – 2025)

The Honourable Vaughn Miller MP, JP

Minister of Environment and Natural Resources
- In office 22 September 2021 – 28 September 2025
- Prime Minister: Philip Davis
- Preceded by: Office established

Member of the Parliament of the Bahamas for Golden Isles
- In office 10 May 2017 – 28 September 2025
- Preceded by: Michael Halkitis
- Succeeded by: Darron Pickstock

Personal details
- Born: 1960 or 1961 Eleuthera, Bahamas
- Died: 28 September 2025 (aged 64) Nassau, Bahamas
- Party: Progressive Liberal Party (2020–2025)
- Other political affiliations: Free National Movement (2017–2019); Independent (2019–2020)

Vaughn Peterson Miller (1960 or 1961 – 28 September 2025) was a Bahamian pastor, broadcaster and politician. He represented the Golden Isles constituency in the House of Assembly of the Bahamas from 2017 until his death, and served as Minister of Environment and Natural Resources in the government of Philip "Brave" Davis from 2021. A former parliamentary secretary in the Free National Movement (FNM) government, he broke with the party, later sitting as an independent MP and then joining the Progressive Liberal Party (PLP). He was widely known for his earlier career as a radio host and pastor and for his advocacy on environmental protection and climate resilience.

== Life and career ==
=== Early life and education ===
Miller was born on the island of Eleuthera around 1960 or 1961 and grew up in the settlement of Green Castle. He received his primary education at Green Castle Primary School and later attended R. M. Bailey Secondary School in Nassau and Windermere High School on Eleuthera.

In the United States he pursued further studies at the University of Richmond, Siena College and Jacksonville Theological Seminary, where he obtained a bachelor's degree and later a master's degree.

=== Broadcasting, ministry and activism ===
Before entering frontline politics Miller built a public profile in broadcasting and Christian ministry. He worked for the state-owned Broadcasting Corporation of The Bahamas and became known nationally as a gospel and talk-radio host, later being described in official tributes as a "veteran broadcaster".

Miller served as senior pastor of Resurrection Ministries in Nassau and was frequently referred to as "Rev. Vaughn Miller" in church and public life. He also founded and led The Vision Group Ltd, a motivational and mentoring organisation, and earlier in his career was active in the trade union movement and community initiatives, being characterised at his state funeral as a pastor, former trade unionist, community activist and radio talk show host.

== Political career ==
=== Free National Movement ===
Miller entered frontline politics at the 2017 Bahamian general election as the Free National Movement candidate in Golden Isles constituency. He defeated incumbent PLP MP Michael Halkitis and was elected to the House of Assembly on 10 May 2017. In the Hubert Minnis administration he was appointed Parliamentary Secretary in the Ministry of Social Services and Urban Development.

During the 2018–19 budget debate Miller was one of four FNM MPs who publicly opposed the government's decision to raise value-added tax from 7 to 12 per cent, arguing that the increase would be difficult for many Bahamian families to bear. On 18 June 2018, he was dismissed as parliamentary secretary for defying the government's position on the budget. The Hubert Minnis administration had insisted that members of the executive support the budget in its entirety.

=== Independent MP ===
On 11 December 2019 Miller announced in the House of Assembly that he was resigning from the FNM to sit as an independent member of Parliament. He cited irreconcilable differences with the party over issues including the leasing of the Town Centre Mall to house the General Post Office. The mall was owned in part by St Anne's MP Brent Symonette, who was a Cabinet minister at the time the lease was agreed. Miller said he could no longer walk in agreement with the party leadership.

=== Progressive Liberal Party ===
In December 2020 Vaughn Miller joined the Progressive Liberal Party. In explaining his decision he linked his political stance to his personal experience as a cancer survivor, stating that a serious illness and its financial consequences had deepened his determination to vote according to his conscience and to focus on the needs of poorer and marginalised Bahamians.

Miller contested Golden Isles for the PLP at the 2021 Bahamian general election, held on 16 September 2021, and retained the seat for a second term as the constituency again changed hands along with the national swing to the PLP. After the election Philip Davis formed a new administration and created a stand-alone Ministry of Environment and Natural Resources, and Miller was appointed as its first minister.

==== Minister of Environment and Natural Resources ====
As minister Miller's portfolio covered environmental protection, implementation of international environmental agreements, land-use planning and permitting, climate resilience and oversight of the country's natural-resource sectors, including mining, oil and gas, and marine ecosystems.

In 2022 he told the United Nations Ocean Conference that The Bahamas was developing a blue carbon offset project to help finance mangrove restoration and coastal resilience, in partnership with The Nature Conservancy. He represented The Bahamas at ministerial-level meetings of the Basel, Rotterdam and Stockholm Conventions in Geneva, where he spoke on pollution, climate change and biodiversity, and at regional fora on energy security and climate resilience.

Miller worked closely with conservation organisations, including The Nature Conservancy, and participated in the celebration of TNC's 20th anniversary in The Bahamas, where he highlighted the role of non-governmental partners in protecting reefs, mangroves and other ecosystems. Regional bodies later singled out his work on climate, waste management and environmental governance in their tributes following his death.

=== By-election ===
Miller's death created a vacancy in the Golden Isles seat during the lifetime of the 14th Bahamian Parliament, triggering a by-election as required by the Parliamentary Elections Act. The by-election was subsequently won by PLP candidate Darron Pickstock, who succeeded Miller as MP for Golden Isles.

== Personal life ==
Miller was married to Cassandra C. Miller (née Allen). The couple had one son Vaughn Miller Jr. He came from a large family with roots in Green Castle, Eleuthera.

Miller was open about having survived thyroid cancer, saying that his illness and its financial impact had reinforced his belief that elected officials should be guided by conscience and a concern for those facing hardship. He continued pastoral work alongside his parliamentary career. Contemporaries frequently emphasised his Christian faith and soft-spoken style in political tributes.

== Death and funeral ==
Miller died at the age of 64. In the early hours of 28 September 2025 police in Nassau were called after a man was found unresponsive in a vehicle. He was taken to Doctors Hospital where he was pronounced dead and later identified as Miller. The police said no foul play was suspected pending an autopsy.

Following Miller's death the government ordered flags to be flown at half-mast and announced a period of official mourning. His body lay in state at the House of Assembly in October 2025, and a state funeral was held at Bahamas Faith Ministries International in Nassau on 24 October, followed by interment at Lakeview Memorial Gardens and Mausoleum. The service was broadcast nationally and attended by senior officials including the governor-general and prime minister.

News of his death prompted tributes and messages of condolence from across the political spectrum. Prime Minister Philip Davis and opposition leader Michael Pintard both referred to his Christian faith, his family and his long service in public office. Internationally, his death drew condolences from regional and international environmental institutions, including CARICOM and the Escazú Agreement secretariat. Their statements noted his work on climate change, marine conservation and environmental governance on behalf of The Bahamas.

== See also ==
- 14th Bahamian Parliament
- Golden Isles (Bahamas Parliament constituency)
