= Charles Maynard (Bahamian politician) =

Bahamian politician (1970–2012)

Member of Parliament for Golden Isles
- In office 2007–2012
- Preceded by: constituency established
- Succeeded by: Michael Halkitis

Personal details
- Born: Charles T. Maynard; 6 June 1970 Nassau, Bahamas
- Died: 14 August 2012 (aged 42) North Abaco, Bahamas
- Party: Free National Movement
- Spouse: Zelena Maynard
- Children: 3 daughters
- Relatives: Allyson Maynard Gibson (cousin)

Charles T. Maynard (6 June 1970 – 14 August 2012) was a Bahamian politician. He was National Chairman of the Free National Movement political party (FNM). Formerly a member of Bahamian parliament, and a minister of youth, sports and culture, Maynard died of an apparent heart attack while campaigning for the FNM in 2012. He was 42, and had been considered a "rising political talent". He was the cousin of Bahamian Attorney-General Allyson Maynard Gibson.

== Education and career ==
He was born in 1970, to Edward Andrew "Dud" Maynard and Isadora Maynard, and graduated from Queen's College, Nassau, and later from the College of The Bahamas. He once served as vice-chairman of the Progressive Liberal Party (PLP) and was deputy leader of the Coalition of Democratic Reform (CDR). On the dissolution of the CDR, he joined the Free National Movement in early 2006, and after winning the Golden Isles Constituency in the 2007 Bahamian general election was appointed to serve in the Cabinet as Minister of State for Culture in the then Ministry of Education, Youth, Sports and Culture, subsequently being promoted to full ministerial status as the portfolio Minister of Youth, Sports and Culture in late 2009.
