= Shane Gibson (politician) =

Bahamian politician

The Hon. D. Shane Gibson

Member of Parliament of the Commonwealth of The Bahamas.
- Incumbent
- Assumed office May 2, 2002
- Preceded by: Theresa M. Moxey-Ingraham
- Constituency: Golden Gates
- Majority: 66.77%

Minister of Immigration, Labour and Training of the Commonwealth of The Bahamas.
- In office February 22, 2005 – February 18, 2007
- Preceded by: Vincent A. Peet
- Succeeded by: Bradley Roberts; Vincent A. Peet

Personal details
- Born: September 7, 1961 (age 64) Nassau, Bahamas
- Party: Progressive Liberal Party
- Spouse: Jacqueline Elaine Williams
- Children: Shamia, Shane Jr., Jaimie and Jazmin
- Website: www.bahamas.gov.bs

David Shane Gibson (born September 7, 1961) is a Bahamian politician who is a former Member of Parliament and former Cabinet Minister. He is the son of Bahamian entertainer "King" Eric Gibson.

== Early career ==
Gibson began work at the Bahamas Telecommunications Company in June 1984. He served as the treasurer of the Bahamas Communications and Public Officers Union from 1991 to 1997, and was the union president from 1997 to 2002.

== Political career ==
On May 2, 2002, D. Shane Gibson was elected to the Parliament of The Bahamas in the Golden Gates constituency in New Providence, as a member of the then ruling Progressive Liberal Party. On May 10, 2002, he was appointed by the then Prime Minister Perry Christie to the Cabinet as the Minister of Housing and National Insurance. Gibson was appointed to the post for which he would become most well known internationally, as the Minister of Immigration, Labour and Training when Christie reshuffled the Cabinet on February 22, 2005. On February 18, 2007, he stepped down as a result of the controversy surrounding his involvement with Anna Nicole Smith. On May 2, 2007, he was re-elected to his seat in Parliament, but as an opposition member because his party lost the general election to the Free National Movement. In April 2020, in a lawsuit against Peter Nygård it was alleged that Nygård "gifted" Smith to Gibson.

He intends to contest the MICAL constituency in the next Bahamian general election.

== Alleged Corruption, Role in Peter Nygård sex trafficking scandal ==
According to the Bahamas Tribune, Gibson was given $94,131.10 between August 2011 and January 2013 by Peter Nygård. In response to this discovery, Gibson claimed the payment was for his 2012 election campaign and community assistance. The 2020 sex trafficking lawsuit against Peter Nygård also alleged that Nygård provided Gibson and members of the PLP, alongside corrupt police officers "children and young women to engage in commercial sex acts with."
