= Bacchus Rolle =

Bahamian politician

Member of the Parliament of the Bahamas for South Beach
- Incumbent
- Assumed office 2021

Personal details
- Party: Progressive Liberal Party

Bacchus O. J. Rolle is a Bahamian politician from the Progressive Liberal Party.

== Career ==
Rolle was head coach for the men's basketball team at the University of the Bahamas.

In the 2021 Bahamian general election, he was elected as the member of parliament for the South Beach constituency.

== See also ==
- 14th Bahamian Parliament
