= The Exumas and Ragged Island =

Bahamas parliamentary constituency

- Constituency
- The Exumas and Ragged Island on a map of the 2021 election
- District: Exuma, Ragged Island
- Electorate: 2,376 (2011)
- Major settlements: George Town

Current constituency
- Seats: 1
- Party: Progressive Liberal Party
- Member: Chester Cooper

The Exumas and Ragged Island is a parliamentary constituency represented in the House of Assembly of the Bahamas. It elects one member of parliament (MP) using the first past the post electoral system. It has been represented by Deputy Prime Minister Chester Cooper from the Progressive Liberal Party since 2017.

== Geography ==
The constituency comprises the districts of Exumas and Ragged Island.

== Members of Parliament ==
Election	Parliament	Candidate	Party
1997	9th Bahamian Parliament	Elliott Lockhart	Free National Movement
2002	10th Bahamian Parliament	Anthony Moss	Progressive Liberal Party
2007	11th Bahamian Parliament	Anthony Moss	Progressive Liberal Party
2012	12th Bahamian Parliament	Anthony Moss	Progressive Liberal Party
2017	13th Bahamian Parliament	Chester Cooper	Progressive Liberal Party
2021	14th Bahamian Parliament	Chester Cooper	Progressive Liberal Party
2026	15th Bahamian Parliament	Chester Cooper	Progressive Liberal Party

== Election results ==
2021
Party	Candidate	Votes	%	±%
PLP	Chester Cooper	1,825	72.59	▲20.59
FNM	Jennifer A. Isaacs-Dotson	678	26.97	▼21.03
Independent	Deidre Taylor	11	0.44	
Turnout		2,514	69.83	
PLP hold				

== See also ==
- Constituencies of the Bahamas
