= Bamboo Town (Bahamas Parliament constituency) =

- Constituency
- Bamboo Town is 14 on this map
- District: New Providence
- Electorate: 5,860

Current constituency
- Seats: 1
- Party: Progressive Liberal Party
- Member: Patricia Deveaux

Bamboo Town is a parliamentary constituency represented in the House of Assembly of the Bahamas. It is located in the eastern part of the Island of New Providence, bordering the constituencies of Pinewood, Garden Hills, Golden Gates, South Beach, and Nassau Village. It is one of the largest constituencies with over 5,000 voters. The current Member of Parliament (MP) is Patricia Deveaux. Deveaux is also the Speaker of the House of Assembly.

== Members of Parliament ==
Election	Member	Party
1992	Tennyson Wells	Free National Movement
1997	Tennyson Wells	Free National Movement
2002	Tennyson Wells	Independent
2007	Branville McCartney	Free National Movement
2012	Renward Wells	Progressive Liberal
2017	Renward Wells	Free National Movement
2021	Patricia Deveaux	Progressive Liberal
2026	Patricia Deveaux	Progressive Liberal

== Election results ==
2021
Party	Candidate	Votes	%	±%
PLP	Patricia Deveaux	1,790	52.10	
FNM	Renward Wells (incumbent)	1,145	33.32	
COI	Marie Daxon	378	11.00	
DNA	Omar Smith	55	1.60	
UCM	Garth Roseboro	29	0.84	
KGM	Pallis Lockhart	29	0.84	
GCP	Amos Hunt	10	0.29	
Turnout		3,436	58.63	
PLP gain from FNM				

== See also ==
- Constituencies of the Bahamas
