= Branville McCartney =

Bahamian politician (born 1967)

W. A. Branville McCartney
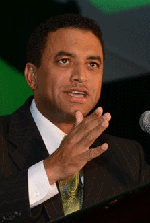
- Born: Nassau, Bahamas; May 6, 1967 (age 59)
- Other name: William Arthur
- Citizenship: Bahamian
- Education: Holborn College
- Occupation: Barrister
- Years active: 22
- Employer: Self-employed
- Organization: Halsbury Chambers
- Political party: Democratic National Alliance
- Spouse: (Divorced)Lisa McCartney
- Children: Kasia; Tai; Lawrence Khail

William Arthur Branville McCartney or Branville McCartney (born May 6, 1967) is a Bahamian politician and lawyer. McCartney is one of the founders of and the leader of the Democratic National Alliance political party.

He previously served in the Cabinet of the third Ingraham administration, but resigned before the 2012 general elections were called.

== Early life and education ==
McCartney attended Kingsway Academy's graduating in 1985. He later attended Holborn Law College, graduating in 1989 with an LL.B honours degree and was subsequently admitted to the Bar of England and Wales at the Inner Temple and the Bahamas Bar in 1990.

== Legal and political career ==
In 2000, McCartney started his own law firm, Halsbury Law, which hosts an annual free legal clinic, the only one in the country opened to the general public.

In May 2007, McCartney was elected a Member of Parliament for the Bamboo Town Constituency as member of the Free National Movement party. He served as State Minister of Tourism and Aviation and later as State Immigration Minister under Prime Minister Hubert Ingraham. He resigned after two years and founded a new political party the Democratic National Alliance.

He was later appointed to the Senate of the Bahamas in 2016 and was very briefly Leader of the Opposition in 2017.
