= Golden Gates (Bahamas Parliament constituency) =

Bahamas parliamentary constituency

- Constituency
- Golden Gates is 15 on this map of the 2021 election
- District: New Providence
- Electorate: 4,388 (2011)

Current constituency
- Seats: 1
- Party: Progressive Liberal Party
- Member: Pia Glover-Rolle

Golden Gates is a parliamentary constituency represented in the House of Assembly of the Bahamas. It elects one member of parliament (MP) using the First past the post electoral system. It has been represented by Pia Glover-Rolle from the Progressive Liberal Party since 2021.

== Geography ==
The constituency comprises the Golden Gates area of Nassau, the capital and largest city of the Bahamas.

== Members of Parliament ==
| Election | Parliament | Candidate | Party |
|---|---|---|---|
| 1997 | 9th Bahamian Parliament | Theresa Moxey Ingraham | Free National Movement |
| 2002 | 10th Bahamian Parliament | Shane Gibson | Progressive Liberal Party |
| 2007 | 11th Bahamian Parliament | Shane Gibson | Progressive Liberal Party |
| 2012 | 12th Bahamian Parliament | Shane Gibson | Progressive Liberal Party |
| 2017 | 13th Bahamian Parliament | Michael Foulkes | Free National Movement |
| 2021 | 14th Bahamian Parliament | Pia Glover-Rolle | Progressive Liberal Party |
| 2026 | 15th Bahamian Parliament | Pia Glover-Rolle | Progressive Liberal Party |

== Election results ==
2021
| Party | Candidate | Votes | % | ±% |
|---|---|---|---|---|
| PLP | Pia Glover-Rolle | 1,872 | 53.87 | ▲13.87 |
| FNM | Michael Foulkes | 1,177 | 33.87 | ▼18.13 |
| COI | Sharmaine Adderley | 263 | 7.57 | |
| DNA | Lamont Nixon | 85 | 2.45 | ▼3.55 |
| Independent | Sidney Sands | 27 | 0.78 | |
| Independent | Anthony Rahming | 26 | 0.75 | ▲0.75 |
| Grand Commonwealth Party | Antonio MIller | 20 | 0.58 | |
| Independent | Urill Usher | 5 | 0.14 | |
| Turnout | | 3,457 | 63.30 | |
| PLP gain from FNM | | | | |

== See also ==
- Constituencies of the Bahamas
