= Michael Halkitis =

Bahamian politician (born 1969)

Minister of Finance
- Incumbent
- Assumed office May 2026

Personal details
- Born: Michael B. Halkitis; 1 February 1969 (age 57) Nassau, The Bahamas
- Party: Progressive Liberal Party
- Education: University of Western Ontario
- Occupation: Politician, Finance Executive

Michael B. Halkitis (born 1 February 1969) is a Bahamian politician from the Progressive Liberal Party (PLP). Since the May 2026 General Election he was appointed as Minister of Finance. He was Minister of Economic Affairs from September 2021 to May 2026. He has served in both the House of Assembly and Senate of the Bahamas.

== Early life ==
Halkitis was born on 1 February 1969 in Nassau, The Bahamas. He went to school on Cat Island and Nassau and subsequently attended St. Augustine's College. Halkitis then attend the College of the Bahamas. He subsequently obtained a Bachelor of Arts degree in economics from the University of Western Ontario in 1991. He later worked as chief financial officer.

== Political career ==
During the 2002 Bahamian general election Halkitis was elected to the House of Assembly for Adelaide Constituency defeating the then long time area MP Frank Watson who was the Deputy Prime Minister of the Bahamas. In 2007 he was appointed to the Senate. During the 2012 Bahamian general election he was once more elected to the House of Assembly, this time for Golden Isles Constituency. He was also appointed Minister of State for Finance. On 20 September 2021 Halkitis was sworn in as the Senate Government Leader and Minister of Economic Affairs in the cabinet of Prime Minister Philip Davis. In November 2021, in response to the Bahamas being given a lower crediting rating by S&P Global Ratings Halkitis stated that the Bahamas was suffering from the impact of Hurricane Dorian, the COVID-19 pandemic in the Bahamas and a lack of fiscal reforms and debt management by the previous administration.

In November 2023 he announced inflation was a serious concern for the Bahamian government and looked into options for the government to impact the cost of living.

In the 2026 Bahamian general election, he became Minister of Finance and won his seat as PLP Member of Parliament for St. Barnabas.
