= South Beach (Bahamas Parliament constituency) =

Bahamas parliamentary constituency

- Constituency
- South Beach is 6 on this map of the 2021 election
- District: New Providence
- Electorate: 4,019 (2011); 5,625 (2021)

Current constituency
- Seats: 1
- Party: Progressive Liberal Party
- Member: Bacchus Rolle

South Beach is a parliamentary constituency represented in the House of Assembly of the Bahamas. It elects one member of parliament (MP) using the first past the post electoral system. It has been represented by Bacchus Rolle from the Progressive Liberal Party since 2021.

== Geography ==
The constituency comprises an area on the south coast of New Providence, outside the city of Nassau, the capital and largest city of the Bahamas.

== Members of Parliament ==
| Election | Parliament | Candidate | Party |
|---|---|---|---|
| 1997 | 9th Bahamian Parliament | Mike Smith | Free National Movement |
| 2002 | 10th Bahamian Parliament | Agatha Marcelle | Progressive Liberal Party |
| 2007 | 11th Bahamian Parliament | Phenton Neymour | Free National Movement |
| 2012 | 12th Bahamian Parliament | Cleola Hamilton | Progressive Liberal Party |
| 2017 | 13th Bahamian Parliament | Jeffrey Lloyd | Free National Movement |
| 2021 | 14th Bahamian Parliament | Bacchus Rolle | Progressive Liberal Party |
| 2026 | 15th Bahamian Parliament | Bacchus Rolle | Progressive Liberal Party |

== Election results ==
2021
| Party | Candidate | Votes | % | ±% |
|---|---|---|---|---|
| PLP | Bacchus Rolle | 1,959 | 52.87 | ▲24.87 |
| FNM | Jeffrey Lloyd | 1,296 | 34.98 | ▼29.02 |
| COI | Devon Emmanuel | 322 | 8.69 | |
| DNA | Jermaine Higgs | 86 | 2.32 | ▼3.68 |
| United Coalition Movement | Anastasia Bethell | 25 | 0.67 | |
| Righteous Government Movement | Micklyn Seymour | 10 | 0.27 | |
| Grand Commonwealth Party | Simon Smith | 7 | 0.19 | |
| Turnout | | 3,705 | 65.87 | |
| PLP gain from FNM | | | | |

== See also ==
- Constituencies of the Bahamas
