= Chester Cooper =

Bahamian politician (born 1970)

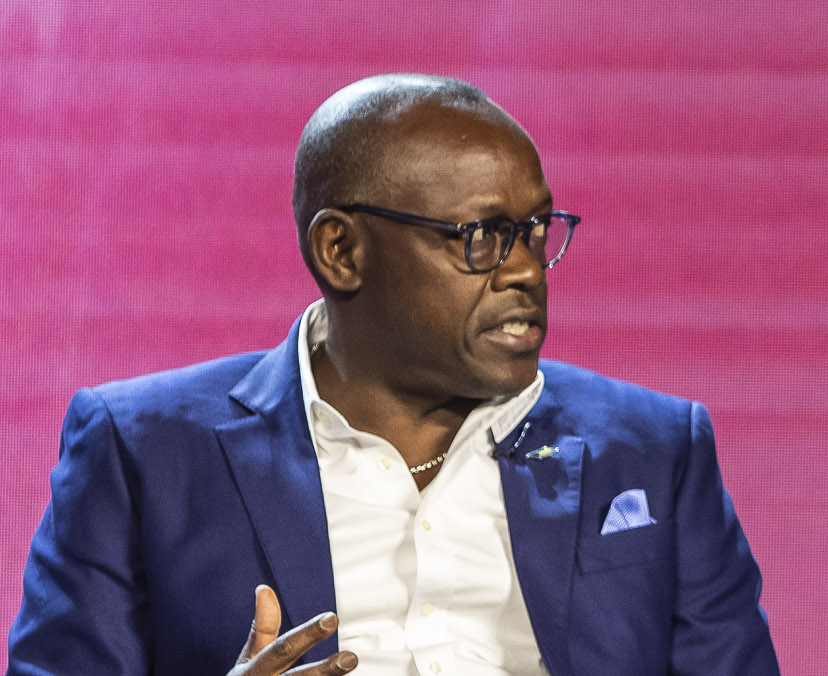

Deputy Prime Minister of the Bahamas
- Incumbent
- Assumed office 17 September 2021
- Prime Minister: Philip Davis
- Preceded by: Desmond Bannister

Minister of Tourism and Aviation
- Incumbent
- Assumed office 17 September 2021
- Prime Minister: Philip Davis
- Preceded by: Dionisio D'Aguilar

Member of Parliament for The Exumas and Ragged Island
- Incumbent
- Assumed office 2017
- Preceded by: Anthony Moss

Personal details
- Born: 29 July 1970 (age 56) Forbes Hill, Exuma, The Bahamas
- Spouse: Cecelia Cooper
- Children: 3
- Education: Acadia University; Nova Southeastern University; Harvard University

Isaac Chester Cooper (born 29 July 1970) is a Bahamian Progressive Liberal Party politician serving as Deputy Prime Minister of the Bahamas to Philip Davis and Minister of Tourism and Aviation since September 2021. He has been the Member of Parliament (MP) for The Exumas and Ragged Island since 2017.

== Early life ==
Cooper was born and raised in Forbes Hill, Little Exuma, the youngest of 12 children to the Reverends Eulon and Louise Cooper. His father died when he was 5. He graduated with a Master of Business Administration in Accounting and Finance from Nova Southeastern University in 1995.

== Career ==
Before going into politics, Cooper worked in finance. He became the Chairman and CEO of BAF Global Group and President and CEO of BAF Financial & Insurance Ltd.

In November 2016, Cooper was ratified as the PLP candidate for The Exumas and Ragged Island in the 2017 general election. He was one of four PLP candidates to win or retain their seat that election. Whilst in Opposition, he became Deputy Leader of the PLP to Leader Philip Davis. As the PLP won the 2021 general election, it was confirmed Cooper would remain in his post and was sworn in as Deputy Prime Minister. He was also appointed Minister of Tourism, Investment, and Aviation.

Cooper was re-elected in the 2026 Bahamian general election. On 16 May 2026, he was sworn in as Minister of Education, Science and Technology.

== Personal life ==
He is married to Cecillia; they have three children. He selects a charity a year to donate his MP salary to.
