= Loretta Butler-Turner =

Bahamian politician

Leader of the Opposition
- In office 11 December 2016 – 10 May 2017
- Monarch: Elizabeth II
- Prime Minister: Perry Christie
- Preceded by: Hubert Minnis
- Succeeded by: Philip Davis

Member of the House of Assembly of the Bahamas for Long Island
- In office 2012 – 2017
- Preceded by: Lawrence Cartwright

Member of the House of Assembly of the Bahamas for Montagu Constituency
- In office 2007 – 2012

Personal details
- Born: Nassau, Bahamas
- Party: Free National Movement

Loretta Butler-Turner is a Bahamian mortician and politician. She was the leader of the opposition in the Bahamian Parliament from December 2016 to May 2017.

== Early life ==
Loretta Butler-Turner was born in Nassau, Bahamas to Rose Marie (née Taylor) and Raleigh Butler, who was the son of the first Bahamian Governor-General, Sir Milo Butler.

She attended primary and secondary school at St. Andrews School in Nassau and was the first Bahamian female to earn a Bachelor of Science degree in mortuary sciences, graduating summa cum laude from the New England Institute of Mortuary Science.

== Mortuary career ==
Butler became an embalmer and mortuary director in her father's business, Butlers’ Funeral Homes and Crematorium of Nassau. She has provided services for several notable deaths, particularly for singer Aaliyah and TV personality Daniel Wayne Smith (son of Anna Nicole Smith).

== Political career ==
In 2007, she was elected to parliament for the Montagu Constituency as a member of the Free National Movement (FNM) party and appointed Minister of State for Social Development.

=== Inter-American Commission of Women ===
Butler served as Vice President of the Inter-American Commission of Women from 2009 to 2011, completing the term of Jeanette Carrillo Madrigal of Costa Rica who had resigned.

=== Deputy Leader ===
In 2012, Butler-Taylor ran for the Long Island seat and was elected succeeding Lawrence Cartwright. That same year, she was chosen as the Deputy Leader of the Free National Movement.

Butler ran for the party leadership in 2014 but was defeated by Hubert Minnis. (Peter Turnquest replaced her as Deputy Leader.)

Finally, in December 2016, Butler-Turner was sworn in as the first woman leader of the opposition in the Bahamas history. Four days later, Butler came under fire from her predecessor, Hubert Minnis, who vowed to have her leadership rescinded.

=== Ouster from Party ===
In April 2017, she was thrown out of the party and ran as an independent in the general election the following month. She received less than 300 votes, thus ending her parliamentary career.
