= Democratic National Alliance (The Bahamas) =

Democratic National Alliance DNA
- Abbreviation: DNA
- Leader: Steven Nesbitt, Sr
- Founded: 12 May 2011
- Youth wing: Young Democrats Alliance
- Ideology: Economic liberalism Fiscal conservatism Egalitarianism; Meritocracy; Critical Thinking; Centrist; Freedom
- Colours: Green
- Slogan: "DNA - Light the Way"

Election symbol
- Lighthouse

Website
- mydnaparty.org

The Democratic National Alliance (DNA) is a political party in The Bahamas, officially launched on 12 May 2011. The current interim leader of the DNA is Steven Nesbitt, Sr. He succeeded Arinthia Komolafe, the party's first female leader elected on 22 February 2019. Mrs. Komolafe succeeded Christopher A. Mortimer, who served as interim leader from 24 October 2017 to 22 February 2019. He was preceded by the party's first leader and one of 13 founding members, Branville McCartney. The party has contested three general elections in The Bahamas in 2012, 2017, and 2021.

== Senate appointment ==
In December 2016, seven of the ten FNM House Members executed a vote of no confidence in the then leader of the opposition, Hubert Minnis. This was the first time that a no-confidence vote was staged in the Bahamas against a leader of the opposition. After the seven members wrote a letter to the Governor-General on the matter, Member of Parliament for Long Island Loretta Butler-Turner was named the new leader of the opposition [1]. Her appointment marked the first time that a woman, a Long Islander, or a person not leading the political party of which they were a member was charged to be the Leader of the Opposition. Subsequent to her appointment, Butler-Turner named then-DNA leader Branville McCartney as Leader of Opposition Business in the Bahamas Senate. This was the first time in which the DNA had been named to the upper chamber and the first time in which a politician from one party appointed a member of a rival party to lead the Bahamian Senate. After months of coalition discussions between opposition parties in advance of the 2017 elections, both Turner and McCartney, in a joint press conference, affirmed that uniting the opposition was the best plan for ousting the Progressive Liberal Party government in the impending elections. However, less than three months later, McCartney announced his resignation from the Bahamas Senate on 2 March 2017 and claimed that Loretta Butler-Turner had only "sown seeds of confusion since assuming her post, bringing no real leadership or focused ideas to the fore." In the 2017 national election, the DNA had a 43% decrease in the party's vote tally compared to their initial election performance in 2012.

== Post-2017 election ==
After a brief post-mortem period following the 2017 general elections, former DNA leader Branville McCartney announced in October 2017 that he would resign as leader of the party. Reflecting on his party's growth since 2011, McCartney thanked his supporters in his farewell address, remarking that his resignation was not "throwing in the towel" but about "clearing a path so that other bright minds within our ranks have an opportunity to shine... so that our organization can move forward with new and fresh ideas." Shortly thereafter and as mandated by the DNA's Constitution, McCartney's former deputy Christopher Mortimer was named the interim leader of the DNA. A special meeting was then called for the election of a new Deputy Leader to fill the spot left vacant by Mortimer's new appointment, ultimately being filled by Arinthia Komolafe. She was the party's 2017 Killarney candidate, who had received 422 votes, approximately 7% of the total votes cast, compared to the other 2 candidates.

Fully invested in the rebuilding process, Mortimer announced that the DNA would host its second National Convention between 22 and 23 February 2019, while also declaring that he would not run for leader of the party. The event proved to be the most competitive in the party's history, with all national offices up for election. In the end, out of a total of about 80 votes, Komolafe defeated challenger Kendal Smith (former Fox Hill candidate) by a total of 66 votes in favor of Arinthia Komolafe and 14 in favor of Kendal Smith, and therefore, she became the first woman to lead the DNA political party. Buschme Armbrister beat out Brenda Harris-Pinder for the deputy leader spot, while DNA newcomer Omar Smith was successful over Rudolph Dean in his bid for the chairman post.

== Electoral results ==
Election	Votes	%	Seats	+/–	Position	Government
2012	13,225	8.48	0 / 38	0	3rd	Extra-parliamentary
2017	7,577	4.72	0 / 39	0	3rd	Extra-parliamentary
2021	1,742	1.38	0 / 39	0	▼4th	Extra-parliamentary
2026	0		0/41	0	0	Extra-parliamentary

The DNA party decided not to contest the 2026 General Elections due to unfairness in the election process. Parliament was dissolved on April 8, 2026, and the General Elections were held on May 12, 2026. It allowed a very short time to campaign and mobilize. The DNA has constantly campaign for electoral changes such as the following:

- Fixed election date – It is difficult under the Westminster system, but doable.
- Independent Boundaries Commission – The Parliament and politicians should not set constituency boundaries. Most countries do a review every 10 years after a national census.
- An independent election commission – The Bahamas is among the few countries where a government department still manages the election.
- Campaign finance reform – Candidates and party.
- Debates – There should be a party leadership debate for those that qualify.
- Two terms for the Prime Minister – This is in alignment with the party constitution.
- Proportional Representation – Distribution of seats by amount of votes.
- Integrity Commission – Independent investigation of politicians and senior civil servants.
