= 2007 Bahamian general election =

- 2 May 2007

All 41 seats in the House of Assembly 21 seats needed for a majority
- Registered: 150,684
- Turnout: 92.11% (▲1.93pp)
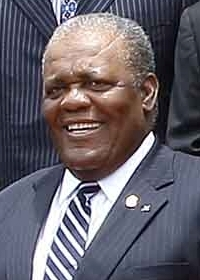

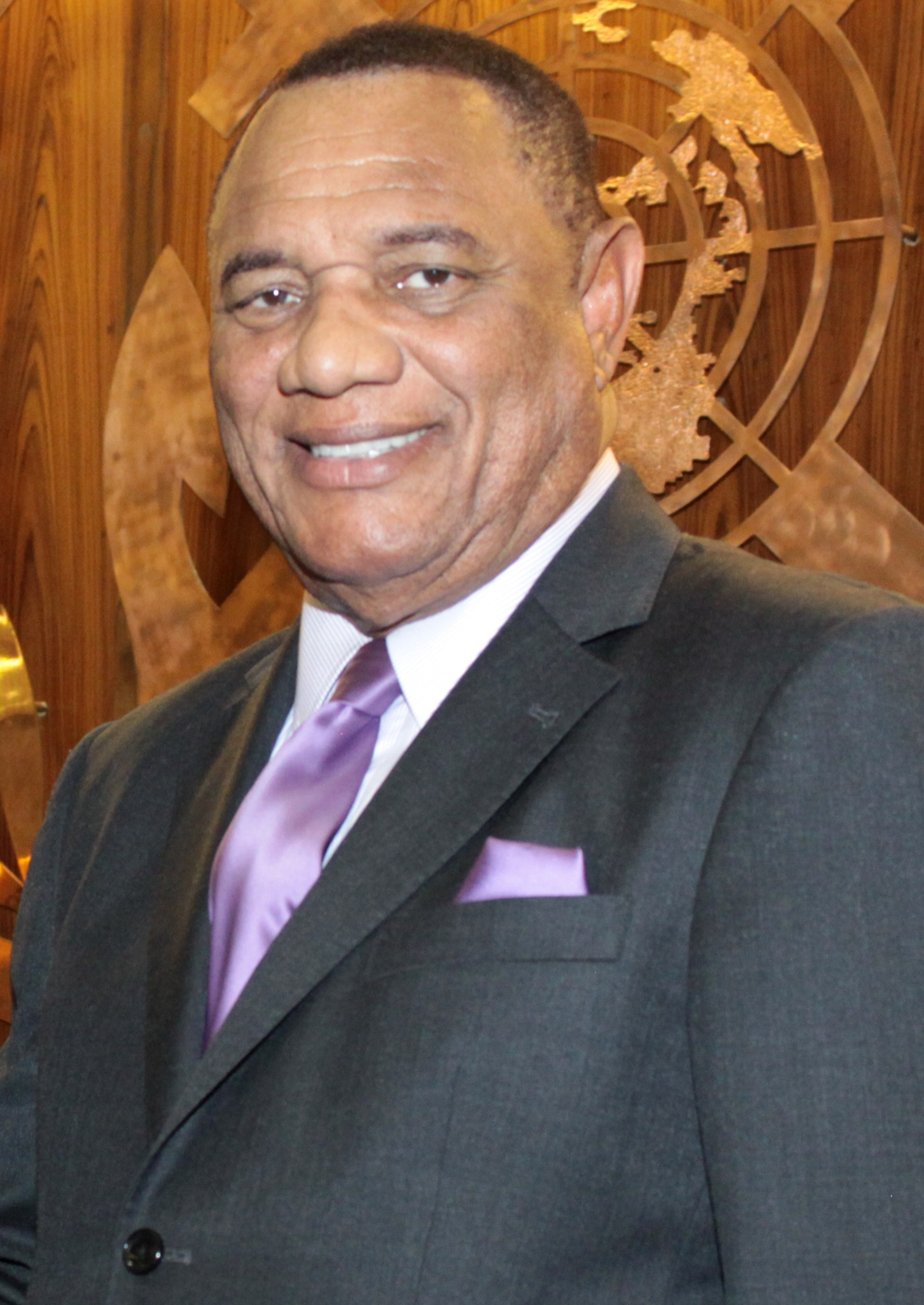
| | First party | Second party |
|---|---|---|
| Leader | Hubert Ingraham | Perry Christie |
| Party | FNM | PLP |
| Leader's seat | North Abaco | Centreville |
| Last election | 40.87%, 7 seats | 51.78%, 29 seats |
| Seats won | 23 | 18 |
| Seat change | ▲16 | ▼11 |
| Popular vote | 68,624 | 64,648 |
| Percentage | 49.85% | 46.96% |
| Swing | ▲8.98 pp | ▼4.82 pp |
Prime Minister before election
Perry Christie
PLP
Elected Prime Minister
Hubert Ingraham
FNM

General elections were held in the Bahamas on 2 May 2007. The result was an opposition victory, with the Free National Movement, led by former Prime Minister Hubert Ingraham, claiming 23 of the 41 seats. Incumbent Prime Minister Perry Christie conceded defeat in a phone call to his rival. Ingraham was sworn into the office of Prime Minister on 4 May.

== Background ==
The Bahamas is dominated by two parties: the left of center Progressive Liberal Party (PLP), and the right of center Free National Movement (FNM). The Free National Movement party came to power in the 1992 election, under the leadership of Hubert Ingraham. After winning the 1997 election and having now served 10 years as prime minister, Ingraham announced that he would step down from the FNM before the start of the 2002 election. Tommy Turnquest then took over the party leadership of the FNM, and many voters, including FNM supporters, felt that Turnquest was much "weaker" than the leader of the Progressive Liberal Party, Perry Christie.

The 2002 election saw a PLP victory with Perry Christie becoming prime minister. After their victory, the PLP focussed and worked on improving and attracting foreign investments for the islands as well as further growing the all-important tourism sector within the Bahamas. Many were confident that a PLP victory in 2007 was possible as the GDP had grown 4% since they took control of the government in 2002.

During the FNM party's November 2005 convention, Hubert Ingraham was elected leader of the party after he had expressed that he would like to return to the party ahead of the 2007 election. Back under the strong leadership of Ingraham, the FNM party became energised when scandal emerged within the PLP. American celebrity Anna-Nicole Smith was photographed in an embrace with Immigration Minister, Shane Gibson of the PLP. Before photos emerged of the two together, many Bahamians were alarmed when Smith filed for legal residency in the Bahamas in August 2006 and was granted residency just a month later, even though the process sometimes takes years. Allegations also emerged that Gibson had received money and gifts from Smith as well. Shane Gibson finally resigned in February 2007 after the photos of him and Smith were published in a local newspaper.

Reuters in March 2007 reported: "Opposition leaders charged that the government's handling of Smith's case shows its incompetence, and two political commentators said the race had tightened. 'The Anna Nicole debacle and all the publicity regarding that ... has energized the base of the (Free National Movement) and hurt the PLP. They are losing ground and something needs to happen to swing the momentum back,’ said an attorney close to the opposition. [...] D'Andre Wright, 18, a first-time voter, said the Smith story was simply a distraction. 'That is fine and dandy but we need to focus on what the FNM can do better than the government,’ she said".

== Opinion polls ==
Many Bahamian voters wanted a more transparent government from the 2007 election, because the economy in 2007 was "anaemic", they viewed the previous administration as unproductive, and there was a rising crime rate. Ingraham was voted over Christie because people wanted change. Although they wanted a lot out of this election, it was not promising as people felt that politics were dominated by an "exclusive clique" due to the candidates Christie and Ingraham being good friends and business partners. The rumours of election fraud also did not appeal to voters and lowered their opinions on both the election as a whole and the candidates, as they did not respond well to the scandals.

Many people believed that the PLP did have a clear plan, and that they did a poor job with public relations. Some thought that House of Assembly did not listen to their constituents, and that the PLP did not focus enough on the common man. They were indecisive and "reluctant to act on critical issues". Many people did not like that their land policy favoured white foreigners. However, others believed the PLP was attempting to establish a "true and sustained democracy", a characteristic that the party had prided itself on since the beginning. Although mainly faults of the PLP have been listed and many people were not surprised nor disappointed by their loss, many also thought the election was a complete toss up with no clear predicted winner.

In general, Bahamian voters favoured Ingraham over Christie. Females did not favour him as much as males, however, as he won the female vote by a smaller margin than the male.

== Results ==
| Party | Votes | % | Seats | +/– |
|---|---|---|---|---|
| Free National Movement | 68,624 | 49.85 | 23 | +16 |
| Progressive Liberal Party | 64,648 | 46.96 | 18 | –11 |
| Bahamas Democratic Movement | 741 | 0.54 | 0 | 0 |
| Independents | 3,654 | 2.65 | 0 | –4 |
| Total | 137,667 | 100.00 | 41 | +1 |
| Valid votes | 137,667 | 99.19 | | |
| Invalid/blank votes | 1,122 | 0.81 | | |
| Total votes | 138,789 | 100.00 | | |
| Registered voters/turnout | 150,684 | 92.11 | | |
Source: Caribbean Elections

== Aftermath ==
The controversial victory of Hubert Ingraham, member of the Free National Movement, incited strong reactions, particularly from the Progressive Liberal Party. The PLP announced it questioned the validity of (and may request a recount of) the electoral votes in districts where the results were closer. Despite a delayed report on the results of the election and the scepticism coming from the PLP, Perry Christie called Hubert Ingraham to concede two and a half hours after the results were reported. However, after the concession of the PLP, rumours of the FNM's victory being overturned. Prime Minister Ingraham countered claims of miscounts by accusing the PLP of corruption mentioning that there had not been this level of corruption in any recent general election. In response to the 49.86% of votes being cast for the FNM, Perry Christie, leader of the PLP said "Ingraham must now live with the reality that he is the first ever prime minister of a government elected with a minority of the popular vote.”

On 7 May, Prime Minister Hubert Ingraham appointed the following Cabinet Ministers:

- Hubert Ingraham, Prime Minister and Minister of Finance
- Brent Symonette, Deputy Prime Minister and Minister of Foreign Affairs.
- Tommy Turnquest, Minister of National Security.
- Claire Hepburn, appointed to the Senate and made Attorney General.
- Carl Bethel, Minister of Education, Youth, Sports and Culture.
- Kenneth Russell, Minister of Housing and National Insurance.
- Earl Deveaux, Minister of Works and Transport.
- Neko Grant, Minister of Tourism and Aviation.
- Dion Foulkes, appointed to the Senate and made Minister of Maritime Affairs and Labour.
- Lawrence (Larry) Cartwright, Minister of Agriculture and Marine Resources.
- Sidney Collie, Minister of Lands and Local Government.
- Dr. Hubert Minnis, Minister of Health and Social Development.
- Zhivargo Laing, Minister of State in the Ministry of Finance.
- Desmond Bannister, Minister of State in the Ministry of Legal Affairs.
- Elma Campbell, appointed to the Senate and made Minister of State for Immigration in the Ministry of National Security.
- Loretta Butler-Turner, Minister of State for Social Services.
- Byron Woodside, Minister of State for Youth & Sports.
- Charles Maynard, Minister of State for Youth & Culture.
- Branville McCartney, Minister of State in the Ministry of Tourism & Aviation.
- Phenton Neymour, Minister State for Public Utilities.

Controversy surrounded the appointment of Brent Symonette as Deputy Prime Minister and Minister of Foreign Affairs, as Perry Christie critiqued him for being a white and wealthy Bahamian. Ingraham responded to this critique by saying:

"If we are to become all that we might be we must aspire to transcend historic prejudices and break loose from the stereotypical bounds of the politics of race and class division that belongs to a bygone era. That is behind us and we must leave it so that we can achieve full unity in our land with a government dedicated to serving all Bahamians, black and white, middle class, rich and poor; young and old able and disabled".
