= Fort Charlotte (Bahamas Parliament constituency) =

- Constituency for the House of Assembly
- Fort Charlotte is number 24
- District: New Providence

Current constituency
- Created: 1967
- Seats: 1
- Party: Progressive Liberal Party
- Member: Sebastian Bastian

Fort Charlotte is a parliamentary constituency represented in the House of Assembly of the Bahamas. Created in 1967, it elects one Member of Parliament using the first-past-the-post voting system. Since the 2026 Bahamian general election, it has been represented by Sebastian Bastian of the Progressive Liberal Party (PLP), who succeeded Alfred Sears.

== Boundaries ==
The constituency encompasses Chippingham (where its namesake Fort Charlotte is located) and Arawak Cay on the northern coast of New Providence. It is bordered by Killarney to the west and downtown Nassau to the east. It is one of the smallest constituencies.

== Members of Parliament ==
Election	Parliament	Candidate	Party
1967	2nd	Curtis McMillan	PLP
1972	4th	E. V. Thompson	PLP
1977	5th	Valentine Grimes	PLP
1982	6th	Franklyn Wilson	PLP
1997	9th	Zhivargo Laing	FNM
2002	10th	Alfred Sears	PLP
2012	12th	Andre Rollins	PLP
2017	13th	Mark Humes	FNM
2021	14th	Alfred Sears	PLP
2026	15th	Sebastian Bastian	PLP

== Elections ==
=== 2026 general election ===
Fort Charlotte MP Alfred Sears announced in 2025 that he would not seek re-election at the 2026 general election. In October 2025, Sebastian Bastian was selected and later ratified as the Progressive Liberal Party candidate for Fort Charlotte. The Free National Movement ratified former Bain and Grants Town MP Travis Robinson as its candidate for the constituency in August 2025.

Bastian won the seat for the PLP, defeating Robinson by more than three to one.

General Election 2026: Fort Charlotte
Party	Candidate	Votes	%	±%
PLP	Sebastian Bastian	2,503	70.31	
FNM	Travis Robinson	776	21.80	
COI	Daphaney Johnson	281	7.89	
Turnout		3,560		
PLP hold				

=== Past elections ===
General Election 2021: Fort Charlotte
Party	Candidate	Votes	%	±%
PLP	Alfred Sears	2,077	63.23	▲22.41
FNM	Drumeco Archer	910	27.70	▼26.68
COI	Daphaney Johnson	154	4.69	New
Independent	Fontella Chipman-Rolle	96	2.92	New
United Coalition	Nelda Fox	23	0.70	New
Independent	Angela Cox	13	0.40	New
Independent	Percival Roberts	12	0.37	New
Turnout		3,285	65.99	
Registered electors		4,978		
PLP gain from FNM				

General Election 2017: Fort Charlotte
Party	Candidate	Votes	%	±%
FNM	Mark Humes	2,153	54.38	▲11.64
PLP	Alfred Sears	1,616	40.82	▼5.21
DNA	Cindy Knowles	172	4.35	▼6.88
BCP	Lavita Thurston	10	0.25	New
BNC	Randy Rolle	8	0.20	New
Turnout		3,959		▼
Registered electors				
FNM gain from PLP				

General Election 2012: Fort Charlotte
Party	Candidate	Votes	%	±%
PLP	Andre Rollins	2,127	46.03	▼6.18
FNM	Zhivargo Laing	1,975	42.74	▼4.18
DNA	Mark Humes	519	11.23	New
Turnout		4,621		▲
Registered electors				
PLP hold				

General Election 2007: Fort Charlotte
Party	Candidate	Votes	%	±%
PLP	Alfred Sears	1,794	52.21	▼6.31
FNM	Michael Barnett	1,612	46.92	▲6.48
BDM	Charles Carroll	30	0.87	New
Turnout		3,436		▼
Registered electors				
PLP hold				

General Election 2002: Fort Charlotte
Party	Candidate	Votes	%	±%
PLP	Alfred Sears	2,126	58.52	▲14.22
FNM	Zhivargo Laing	1,469	40.44	▼15.02
Coalition + Labor	Noel St. Claude	38	1.05	New
Turnout		3,633		▲
Registered electors				
PLP gain from FNM				

General Election 1997: Fort Charlotte
Party	Candidate	Votes	%	±%
FNM	Zhivargo Laing	1,858	55.46	
PLP	Franklyn Wilson	1,484	44.3	▼
Independent	Clarence E. Johnson	8	0.24	New
Turnout		3,350		
Registered electors				
FNM gain from PLP				

== See also ==
- Constituencies of the Bahamas
