= List of political parties in the Bahamas =

Political parties in the Bahamas may be "classified", "nonclassified", or "unclassified". Classified parties are "major" or "minor" depending on electoral performance and competitive ability.

== Parties represented in Parliament ==
Party	Abbr.	Leader	Political position	Ideology	Senators	Assembly members
Progressive Liberal Party	PLP	Philip Davis	Centre	Social liberalism Progressivism; Populism	12 / 16	33 / 41
Free National Movement	FNM	Michael Pintard	Centre-right	Conservative liberalism	4 / 16	8 / 41

== Classification of Bahamian Political Parties ==
=== Classified Major ===
- Progressive Liberal Party (PLP)
- Free National Movement (FNM)
- Bahamas Democratic Party (BDP)
- United Bahamian Party (UBP)-disbanded
- Bahama Democrat Labour Party (BDLP)

=== Classified Minor: Macro ===
- Bahamas Constitution Party (BCP)
- Democratic National Alliance (DNA)
- Coalition for Democratic Reform (CDR)

=== Classified Minor: Micro ===
- The People's Movement (TPM)
- Bahamas National Coalition Party (BNCP)
- Bahamas Constitution Party (BCP)
- God's People Party (GPP)
- Vanguard Nationalist & Socialist Party (VNSP)

=== Nonclassified: NANO ===
- Independent

=== New ===
- Bahamian Way Forward Movement (BWFM)
- Coalition of Independents (COI)
- Grand Commonwealth Party (GCP)
- Kingdom Government Movement (KGM)
- Justice Labour Party (JLP)
- Righteous Government Movement (RGM)
- United Coalition (independents)

== Unclassified Political Parties (defunct) ==
- United Bahamian Party (UBP)
- National Development Party (NDP)
- National Democratic Party
- Bahama Democrat Labour Party (BDLP)
- Social Democratic Party (SDP)
- Workers Party (WP)
- Coalition for Democratic Reform (CDR)
- Vanguard Nationalist & Socialist Party (VNSP)
- Bahamian National Party (BNP)
- Bahamian Democratic Party (BDP)
- Commonwealth Democratic Party (CDP)

== See also ==
- Lists of political parties
