= Shadow cabinet (Bahamas) =

Shadow cabinet in the Bahamas

In Bahamian politics, the shadow cabinet is the opposition's equivalent to the cabinet. It comprises the most senior figures within the opposition, headed by the leader of the opposition as the counterpart to the prime minister of the Bahamas. The official opposition sit in the Parliament of the Bahamas.

== 2021 shadow cabinet ==
In the 2021 Bahamian general election, the FNM won 7 MPs so a shadow cabinet was not appointed. In February 2022, Michael Pintard was elected leader, Shanendon Cartwright as deputy leader and Duane Sands as national chairman.

== 2017 shadow cabinet ==
After the 2017 Bahamian general election, leader of the Progressive Liberal Party Philip "Brave" Davis appointed a shadow Cabinet.

| Party | Shadow Minister | Portrait | Portfolios |
|---|---|---|---|
| PLP | Philip Davis | | Works, urban development, Bahamas Power and Light (BPL) and Bahamasair |
| PLP | Glenys Hanna Martin | | shadow minister of social services, transport, aviation, national security and tourism |
| PLP | Picewell Forbes | | shadow minister of the environment, housing and sports and culture |
| PLP | Chester Cooper | | shadow minister of the environment, housing and sports and culture |
| PLP | Fred Mitchell | | shadow minister for foreign affairs, immigration, labor, public service, and trade |
| PLP | Michael Darville | | shadow minister of health and education; National Health Insurance and Grand Bahama |
| PLP | Clay Sweeting | | shadow minister of agriculture, local government and marine resources |
| PLP | JoBeth Coleby-Davis | | shadow attorney general as well as be responsible for legal affairs; youth |

== 2012 shadow cabinet ==
After the 2012 Bahamian general election, leader of the Free National Movement (FNM) Dr. Hubert Minnis appointed a shadow Cabinet on behalf of the Official Opposition.

| Party | Shadow Minister | Portrait | Portfolios |
|---|---|---|---|
| FNM | Hubert Minnis | | Shadow minister of national security and health |
| FNM | Loretta Butler-Turner | | Shadow minister of social services and national insurance |
| FNM | Neko Grant | | Shadow minister of works and urban development |
| FNM | Desmond Bannister | | Shadow minister of education, science and technology |
| FNM | Zhivargo Laing | | Shadow minister of finance and financial services |
| FNM | Edison Key | | Shadow minister of agriculture, marine resources and local government |
| FNM | Hubert Chipman | | Shadow minister of foreign affairs and immigration |
| FNM | K. Peter Turnquest | | Shadow minister of Grand Bahama |
| FNM | Richard Lightbourn | | Shadow attorney general/minister of legal affairs |
| FNM | Theo Neilly | | Shadow minister of tourism, transport and aviation |
| FNM | Kwasi Thompson | | Shadow minister of environment and housing |
| FNM | Heather Hunt | | Shadow minister of youth, sports and culture |
