= Sebastian Bastian =

Bahamian politician and businessperson

Sebastian J. D. Bastian

Minister of Innovation and National Development
- Incumbent
- Assumed office 16 May 2026
- Prime Minister: Philip Davis

Member of the House of Assembly for Fort Charlotte
- Incumbent
- Assumed office 2026
- Preceded by: Alfred Sears

Personal details
- Born: August 1980 (age 45) Nassau, The Bahamas
- Party: Progressive Liberal Party
- Education: ATI Technical Institution
- Occupation: Entrepreneur, diplomat, politician

Sebastian J. D. Bastian (also known as Sebas Bastian, born August 1980) is a Bahamian entrepreneur, diplomat and politician who has served as Minister of Innovation and National Development since 2026 and as the member of the House of Assembly for Fort Charlotte since the 2026 Bahamian general election. He previously served as non-resident ambassador of The Bahamas to the Central American Integration System and was appointed non-resident High Commissioner-designate to South Africa.

In business, Bastian is known as a co-founder and former chief executive of the domestic gaming operator Island Luck, chairman of the property developer Brickell Management Group and a director of Investar Securities Ltd.

== Early life and family ==
Bastian was born in Nassau, to Edwin Emmanuel "Smiley" Bastian, a businessman and restaurateur originally from Staniard Creek, North Andros. Bastian studied at ATI Technical Institution in Miami, Florida.

== Business ==
Bastian began his career in his late teens in the electronics and satellite dish business, later moving into the distribution of prepaid phone cards before expanding into technology, gaming, real estate and other ventures.

Bastian founded the Island Luck gaming company (Playtech Systems Ltd.) in 2009 and later led the We Care Coalition during public debate over legalising web shop gaming. After licensing for gaming houses was introduced under the Gaming Act 2014, Island Luck became regulated by the Gaming Board for The Bahamas. By 2015, Island Luck was described as the country's largest web shop chain, and in 2018 as the largest operator of gaming houses. Island Luck is associated with the Island Luck Cares Foundation, which donated 500 tablet computers to the Ministry of Education in 2020 to support virtual learning during the COVID-19 pandemic.

Bastian is chairman of Brickell Management Group (BMG), a Nassau-based real estate development and construction company. BMG has been linked to large-scale mixed-use and residential developments in western New Providence. BMG was also involved in redeveloping facilities for the University of The Bahamas North (UB North) in downtown Freeport. The university said Bastian contributed more than US$4 million to the first phase of the project and described this as the largest individual private donation in the university's history.

Bastian is chairman of WYYSE Technologies Group. In 2021 Click Partners LP, which he co-founded, acquired the cross-border logistics and e-commerce business Aeropost. The company briefly re-entered the Bahamian market before shutting down local operations in 2024 as part of restructuring. Bastian is also the principal of EV Motors, an automotive dealership.

== Diplomatic service ==
In May 2021, Bastian was appointed non-resident High Commissioner-designate to South Africa under the Free National Movement (FNM) government.

In March 2022 prime minister Philip Davis appointed Bastian non-resident ambassador to the Central American Integration System (SICA). As a non-resident ambassador in Central America, Bastian has conducted official engagements with several states, including presenting letters of credence to Guatemala in 2023 and signing an air services memorandum of understanding with El Salvador in 2025.

== Political career ==
In October 2025, the Progressive Liberal Party (PLP) Candidates Committee selected Bastian as its prospective candidate for the Fort Charlotte constituency at the 2026 general election. The PLP later ratified fourteen candidates at party headquarters, including Bastian for Fort Charlotte. Bastian said he would step back from business operations to avoid conflicts of interest.

In the 2026 Bahamian general election, Bastian was elected to the House of Assembly for Fort Charlotte, defeating Free National Movement candidate Travis Robinson. On 16 May 2026, following the PLP's re-election, Bastian was sworn in as Minister of Innovation and National Development in Davis's second administration.
