= Carmichael (Bahamas Parliament constituency) =

Bahamas parliamentary constituency

- Constituency
- Carmichael is number 5
- District: New Providence
- Electorate: 5,276 (2012)

Current constituency
- Created: 2007
- Seats: 1
- Party: Progressive Liberal Party
- Member: Keith Bell

Carmichael is a parliamentary constituency represented in the House of Assembly of the Bahamas.

== Geography ==
The constituency is based around the Carmichael Road area of Nassau.

== Members of Parliament ==
Election	Parliament	Candidate	Party
1992	8th Bahamian Parliament	Anthony "Boozey" Rolle	Free National Movement
1997	9th Bahamian Parliament	Anthony "Boozey" Rolle	Free National Movement
2002	10th Bahamian Parliament	John Carey	Progressive Liberal Party
2007	11th Bahamian Parliament	Desmond Bannister	Free National Movement
2012	12th Bahamian Parliament	Daniel Johnson	Progressive Liberal Party
2017	13th Bahamian Parliament	Desmond Bannister	Free National Movement
2021	14th Bahamian Parliament	Keith Bell	Progressive Liberal Party
2026	15th Bahamian Parliament	Keith Bell	Progressive Liberal Party

== Election results ==
2021
Party	Candidate	Votes	%	±%
PLP	Keith Bell	1,922	48.79	
FNM	Desmond Bannister	1,603	40.70	
DNA	Arinthia Komolafe	210	5.33	
COI	Charlotte Green	155	3.94	
Independent	O'Brien Thomas Knowles	22	0.56	
Kingdom Government Movement	Samuel Johnson	21	0.53	
Grand Commonwealth Party	Glen Rolle	6	0.15	
Turnout		3,939	65.19	
PLP gain from FNM				

== See also ==
- Constituencies of the Bahamas
