= Politics of the Bahamas =

The Bahamas is a parliamentary constitutional monarchy headed by King Charles III in his role as King of the Bahamas. The politics of the Bahamas takes place within a framework of parliamentary democracy, with a Prime Minister as the Head of Government. The Bahamas is an Independent Country and a member of the Commonwealth of Nations. As a former British colony, its political and legal traditions closely follow those of the United Kingdom. King Charles III is the head of state, but executive power is exercised by the cabinet. Legislative power is vested in the two chambers of parliament. The Judiciary is independent of the executive and the legislature and jurisprudence is based on English common law. The multi-party system is dominated by the Progressive Liberal Party and the Free National Movement. The constitution protects freedom of speech, press, worship, movement, and association.

== Political developments ==
In the first half of the 20th century, the Bahamas was largely controlled by a group of influential white merchants known as the "Bay Street Boys", who dominated both the economy and the legislature. Executive power rested with the British Governor-in-Council.

The Progressive Liberal Party was formed in 1953 to represent the disenfranchised black majority and this led to the formation of the United Bahamian Party by the Bay Street Boys. In 1964, the British gave the Bahamas internal self-governance and the white UBP leader Roland Symonette became the country's first premier. In 1967, under the leadership of a young black lawyer named Lynden Pindling, the PLP were elected and went on to lead the Bahamas into independence in 1973.

A coalition of PLP dissidents and former UBP members formed the Free National Movement (FNM) in 1971 under the leadership of Cecil Wallace-Whitfield. After Whitfield's death in 1990, another ex-PLP, Hubert Ingraham, became leader of the FNM and took the party to victory in the 1992 general election. The FNM was re-elected by a landslide in 1997, but lost to a resurgent PLP, under the leadership of his former law partner Perry Christie, in 2002. Ingraham turned the party leadership over to Tommy Turnquest in 2002, but in 2007, due partly to the Anna Nicole Smith scandal, he returned to lead the FNM to victory again by a five-seat margin.

Due to the inefficiency of the Ingraham government, Christie's PLP regained the government in a massive landslide in 2012. The Christie government was once more libel to charges of massive corruption, and in 2017, there was an even bigger swing back to the FNM, leaving the PLP with a mere four seats in the parliament. general election|in 2002]], when the PLP returned to power under Perry Christie. Ingraham returned to power from 2007 to 2012, followed by Christie again from 2012 to 2017. With economic growth faltering, Bahamians re-elected the FNM in 2017, with Hubert Minnis becoming the fourth prime minister.

In September 2021, Prime Minister Hubert Minnis lost in a snap election as the economy struggles to recover from its deepest crash since at least 1971. Progressive Liberal Party (PLP) won 32 of the 39 seats in the House of Assembly. Free National Movement (FNM), led by Minnis, took the remaining seats. On 17 September 2021, the chairman of the Progressive Liberal Party (PLP) Phillip “Brave” Davis was sworn in as the new Prime Minister of Bahamas.

== Executive branch ==
The Bahamas is a constitutional monarchy based on the Westminster system of parliamentary government. King Charles III is the head of state as King of the Bahamas. He is viceregally represented by the Governor-General of the Bahamas who acts on the advice of the prime minister and the cabinet.

The leader of the majority party in parliament serves as prime minister and head of government. The cabinet consists of at least nine members, including the prime minister and ministers of executive departments. They answer politically to the lower House of Assembly.

The governor-general appoints the chief justice of the Supreme Court on the advice of the prime minister and the leader of the opposition. Other justices are appointed on the advice of a judicial commission. The Judicial Committee of the Privy Council in London serves as the highest appellate court for the Bahamas.

Main office-holders

The King of the Bahamas:
Charles III
since
8 September 2022

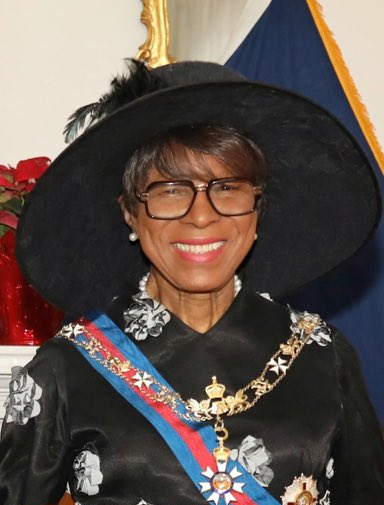
The Governor-General of the Bahamas:
Cynthia A. Pratt
since
1 September 2023

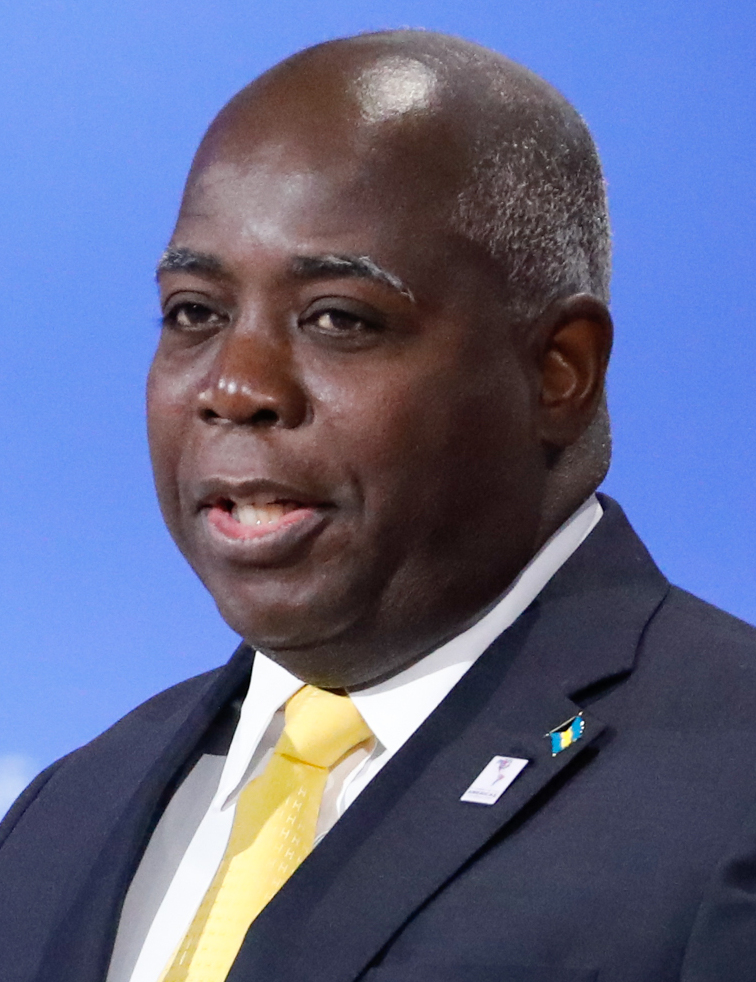
The Prime Minister of the Bahamas:
Philip Davis
since
17 September 2021

== Legislative branch ==
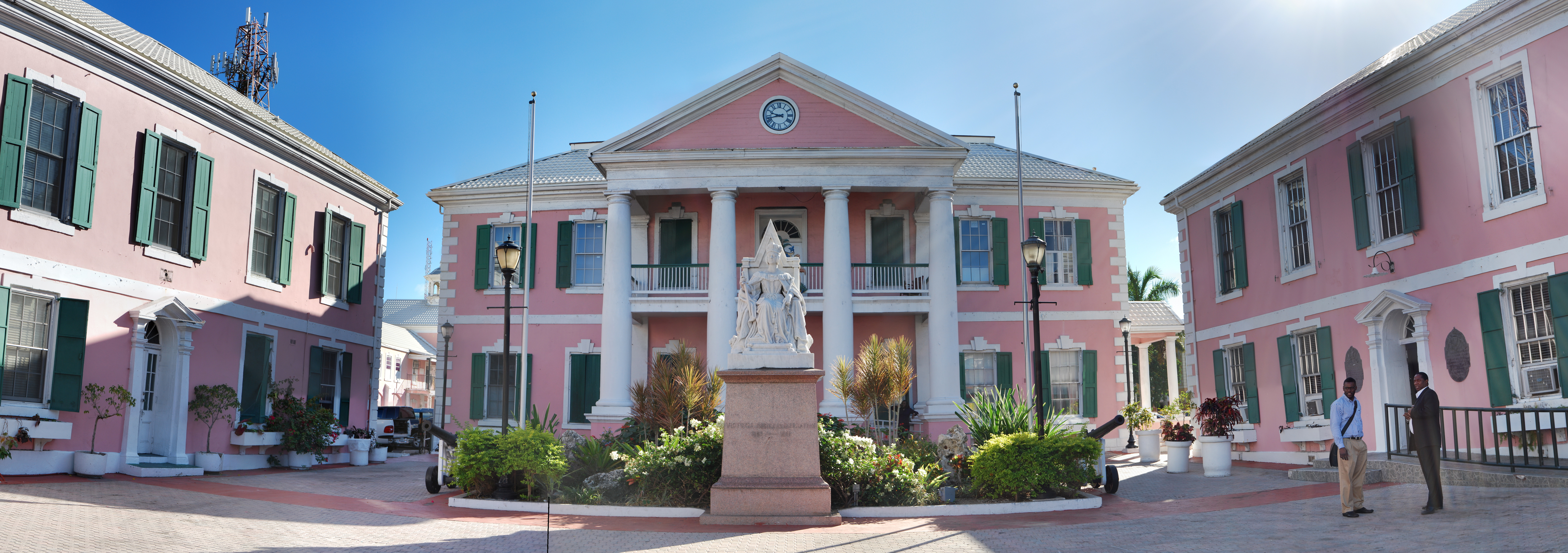
Parliament of the Bahamas, located in downtown Nassau

The House of Assembly consists of 38 members, elected from individual constituencies for five-year terms. As under the Westminster system, the government may dissolve the parliament and call elections at any time. The House of Assembly performs all major legislative functions. The Leader of the Opposition can appoint a Shadow cabinet.

The Senate consists of 16 members appointed by the governor-general, including nine on the advice of the prime minister, four on the advice of the leader of the opposition, and three on the advice of the prime minister after consultation with the leader of the opposition.

== Movements ==
- Republicanism in the Bahamas

== International organization participation ==
- ACP
- World Customs Organization
- Caribbean Development Bank
- Caribbean Community (Caricom)
- Commonwealth Games Federation
- Commonwealth of Nations
- United Nations Economic Commission for Latin America and the Caribbean
- Food and Agriculture Organization
- Group of 77
- IADB
- International Bank for Reconstruction and Development
- ICAO
- ICFTU
- International Red Cross and Red Crescent Movement
- International Finance Corporation
- International Federation of Red Cross and Red Crescent Societies
- International Labour Organization
- International Monetary Fund
- International Maritime Organization
- International Olympic Committee
- International Telecommunication Union
- Inmarsat
- Intelsat
- Interpol
- Latin American Economic System
- Non-Aligned Movement
- Organization of American States
- OPANAL
- Organisation for the Prohibition of Chemical Weapons
- United Nations Conference on Trade and Development
- UNESCO
- United Nations Industrial Development Organization
- United Nations
- Universal Postal Union
- World Health Organization
- World Intellectual Property Organization
- World Meteorological Organization
- World Trade Organization (applicant)

== See also ==
- Office of the Attorney-General & Ministry of Legal Affairs (Bahamas)
