= Keith Bell (Bahamian politician) =

Bahamian politician

Minister of Housing and Urban Renewal
- Incumbent
- Assumed office 4 September 2023
- Prime Minister: Philip Davis
- Preceded by: JoBeth Coleby-Davis (as Minister of Housing & Transport)

Minister of Labour and Immigration
- In office 2021 – 4 September 2023
- Prime Minister: Philip Davis
- Preceded by: JoBeth Coleby-Davis (Housing & Transport)
- Succeeded by: Pia Glover-Rolle (Labour & Public Service); Alfred Sears (Immigration and National Insurance)

Minister of State for National Security
- In office 2012–2017
- Prime Minister: Perry Christie

Member of Parliament for Carmichael
- Incumbent
- Assumed office 23 September 2021
- Preceded by: Desmond Bannister
- In office 2012–2017
- Preceded by: Desmond Bannister
- Succeeded by: Desmond Bannister

Personal details
- Born: Keith Ricardo Bell
- Party: Progressive Liberal Party
- Education: College of the Bahamas; University of the West Indies

Keith Ricardo Bell is a Bahamian Progressive Liberal Party politician as the Minister of Housing and Urban Renewal since 2023. He is the Member of Parliament (MP) for Carmichael since 2021.

Bell also served as the MP for Carmichael Constituency from 2012 to 2017.

== Career ==
=== Education and Early Career ===
Bell holds an Associate of Arts Degree in Law and Criminal Justice from the College of the Bahamas, and a Law degree from the University of the West Indies. Before entering politics, Bell served as a police officer for over 22 years, earning the Baton of Honour as the top graduate from the Police College in 1986. He also lectured at the College of the Bahamas and served as a Member of the Catholic Board of Education and the Bahamas National Trust.

=== Parliament ===
==== 1st Term (2012-2017) ====
Keith Bell was first elected as the Member of Parliament (MP) for the Carmichael constituency in 2012, defeated FNM incumbent Desmond Bannister. He was appointed as the Minister of State for National Security by Prime Minister Perry Christie, serving in the position from 2012 to 2017.

==== Minister of State for National Security ====
During his tenure as Minister of State for National Security, Bell was responsible for leading the implementation of several key initiatives, including the Bahamas National Crime Prevention Strategy and the Police Recruitment and Training Program.

As Minister, Bell was accused of mismanagement of funds. He lost his bid for re-election in 2017 to Thomas Desmond Bannister.

==== 2nd Term (2021-present) ====
Keith Bell was re-elected as the MP for Carmichael in 2021, defeating incumbent Thomas Desmond Bannister. During his tenure, he has served in Prime Minister Philip Davis' Cabinet as the Minister of Labour and Immigration and as the Minister of Housing and Urban Renewal.
