= Jeanne I. Thompson =

Bahamian attorney

Justice of the Supreme Court of the Bahamas
- In office 2002–2007

Personal details
- Born: Nassau, Bahamas
- Occupation: Attorney, playwright, journalist

Jeanne I. Thompson is a Bahamian attorney who was a Justice of the Supreme Court of the Bahamas from 2002 until 2007. Prior to her legal career, Thompson had a career as a playwright and a journalist.

== Early life and education ==
Thompson was born in Nassau, Bahamas, to Ellison and Sybil (Isaccs) Thompson. She attended public schools in Nassau. After she graduated from the Government High School, Nassau, she attended a Wolmer's boarding school in Kingston, Jamaica.

== Law career ==
Thompson joined the English Bar in 1964 and the Bahamas Bar in 1965. She began her legal career with Dupuch & Turnquest, working under Eugene Dupuch and Orville Turnquest. Later, Thompson joined the law firm of Kendal Isaacs and subsequently she became a partner in the firm of Isaacs, Johnson & Thompson. In 1981, Thompson founded her own firm.

Thompson was a Justice of the Bahamian Supreme Court from 2002 until 2007. Thompson continues providing legal services through the Bahamas Legal Aid Clinic and as the Consultant Counsel at Halsbury Chambers.

== Writing ==
The Fergusons of Farm Road was 15-minute radio serial written by Thompson and Jamaican Sonia Mills that premiered in 1970 and ran on ZNS for 137 weeks. Thompson created the show at the request of Clement Maynard, who at the time was the Minister of Tourism, to improve Bahamian attitudes towards tourists. The program was a combination of education and entertainment and showed Bahamian nationals as au natural for the first time in Bahamian broadcasting history. It was performed by an all-Bahamian cast of actors, with Charles Bowleg as Zeke, Miriam Johnson as Mina, Lilian Collie as Miss Lye, Eddie Minnis as Sam, Calvin Cooper as the bishop, and Heather Thompson as Blossom. The script had biblical allusions similar to themes used by the Progressive Liberal Party.

Thompson worked as a journalist at The Nassau Guardian from 1974 to 1978. In her column, "Satirically Speaking", she used the characters "Zeke and Sophie" to comment on political, social and economic issues.
