= Cyril Fountain =

Bahamian judge and lawyer (1929–2024)

Sir Cyril Stanley Smith Fountain (26 October 1929 – 19 May 2024) was a Bahamian judge and lawyer.

== Early life and education ==
Fountain got his early education at the Quarry Mission School, the Western Junior and Senior Schools, Johnson's Private School, and then the Government High School, which he completed in 1947.

Following his graduation he had a brief athletic career as an opening batsman for the Western Sporting Club. He was also coached in swimming by Orville Turnquest, and under his tutelage went on to win the Prince George Dock–Fort Montagu marathon.

He went on to work at the Bahamas Telecommunications Department and other places before leaving the Bahamas to attend St. Benedict's College in Kansas (one of the predecessors of today's Benedictine College).

After his graduation in 1953, he returned to the Bahamas and eventually became a teacher, working in various places including the Abaco Islands and West End.

Fountain's legal education began with a fortuitous incident: he was talking with his friend Kendal Isaacs, the Solicitor-General of the Bahamas, when Isaacs asked him whether he was interested in becoming a lawyer. Isaacs referred Fountain to Leonard Knowles, by then already a noted attorney. After working with Knowles for a year, Fountain went on to read law at King's College London in 1959.

== Legal career ==
Fountain was called to the English Bar in January 1963, and the Bahamas Bar the following month. He worked in private practice for the next decade, but then entered into politics.

He ran as the Free National Movement candidate for the Northern Long Island, Rum Cay, and San Salvador constituency in the 1972 general election, and was elected a Member of the Parliament of the Bahamas. He was briefly appointed as leader of the opposition in 1976. He served until 1977.

He was named as a Justice of the Supreme Court of the Bahamas from October 1993 to June 1994, as a Senior Justice from July 1994 to December 1995, and as the Chief Justice from January 1995 to October 1996.

After stepping down as Chief Justice, Fountain moved to Grand Bahama and returned to private practice.

== Death ==
Fountain died on 19 May 2024, at the age of 94.

Legal offices
Preceded by Joaquim Gonsalves-Sabola	Chief Justice of the Bahamas; 1995–1996	Succeeded by Joan Sawyer
