= Marco City (Bahamas Parliament constituency) =

Bahamas parliamentary constituency

- Constituency
- Marco City is 28 on this map of the 2021 election
- District: Grand Bahama
- Electorate: 4,296 (2011); 6,287 (2021)
- Major settlements: Freeport, Marco City

Current constituency
- Seats: 1
- Party: Free National Movement
- Member: Michael Pintard

Marco City is a parliamentary constituency represented in the House of Assembly of the Bahamas. It elects one member of parliament (MP) using the first past the post electoral system. It has been represented by Michael Pintard from the Free National Movement since 2021.

== Geography ==
The constituency consists of the Marco City area of Grand Bahama.

== Members of Parliament ==
Election	Parliament	Winning Candidate	Party
2002	10th Bahamian Parliament	Pleasant Bridgewater	Progressive Liberal Party
2007	11th Bahamian Parliament	Zhivargo Laing	Free National Movement
2012	12th Bahamian Parliament	Greg Moss	Progressive Liberal Party
2017	13th Bahamian Parliament	Michael Pintard	Free National Movement
2021	14th Bahamian Parliament	Michael Pintard	Free National Movement
2026	15th Bahamian Parliament	Michael Pintard	Free National Movement

== Election results ==
2021
Party	Candidate	Votes	%	±%
FNM	Michael Pintard	2,340	56.64	▼7.36
PLP	Curt G. Hollingsworth	1,359	32.90	▼0.1
COI	Crystal Smith	298	7.21	
Independent	Kevin Ferguson	52	1.26	
Kingdom Government Movement	Demetrius T. Symonette	38	0.92	
Righteous Government Movement	Dexter Edwards	21	0.51	
Independent	Dexter A. Cleare	12	0.29	
DNA	Stephone Forbes	11	0.27	▼2.73
Turnout		4,131	65.71	
FNM hold				

== See also ==
- Constituencies of the Bahamas
