= Social Democratic Party (Bahamas) =

The Social Democratic Party was a political party in the Bahamas.

The party was created in late 1979 by dissident members of Bahamian Democratic Party: Keith Duncombe, James Knowles, Michael Lightbourne and Norman Solomon. The party was led by Norman Solomon, white millionaire, who was appointed as the Leader of the Opposition in the House of Assembly of the Bahamas.

Parliamentary members of the party joined Free National Movement before the 1982 elections. Solomon run in the elections as independent, but was not elected.
