= Michael Pintard =

Bahamian politician (born 1964)

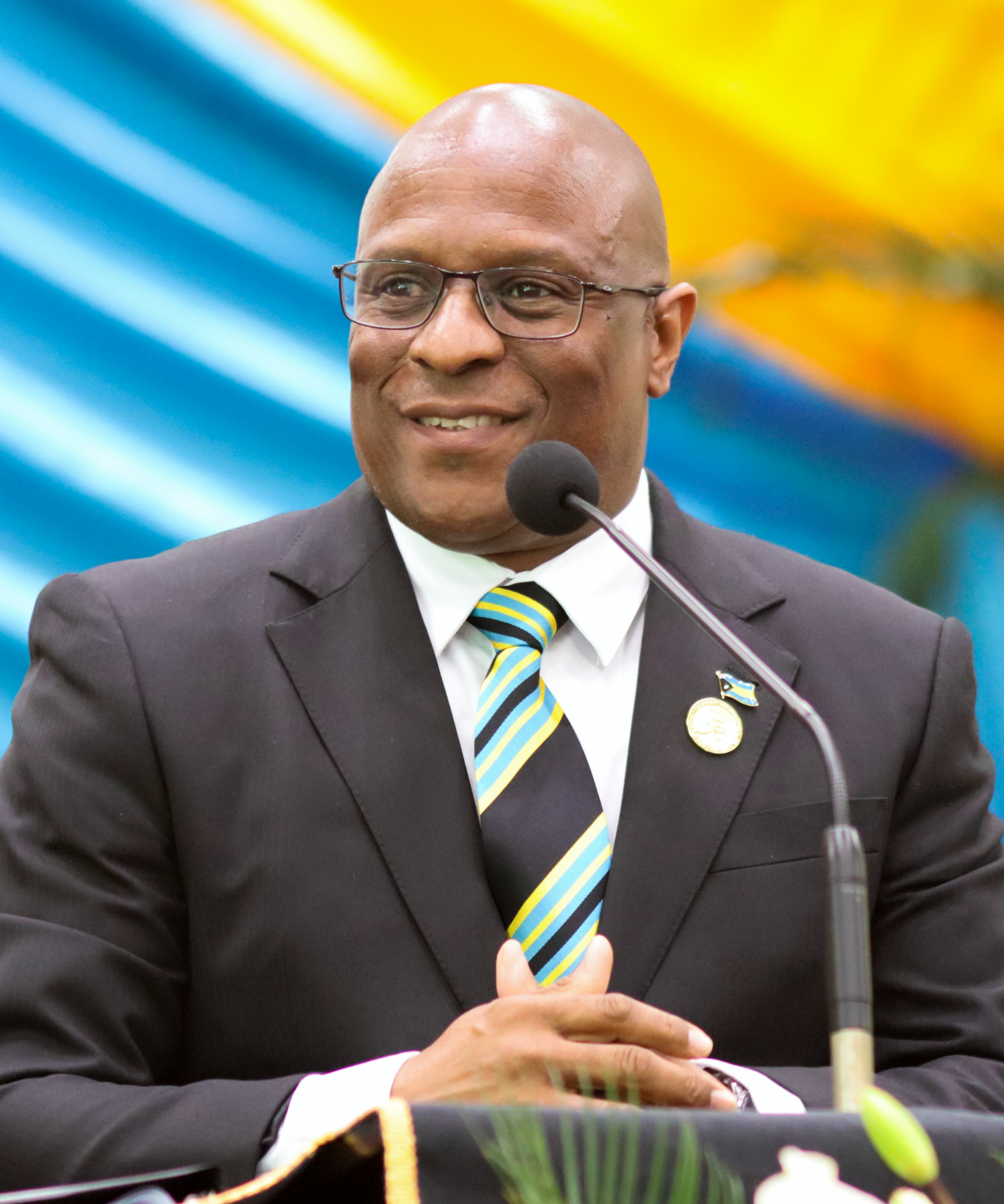
- Pintard in 2023

Leader of the Opposition
- Incumbent
- Assumed office 29 November 2021
- Monarchs: Elizabeth II; Charles III
- Prime Minister: Philip Davis
- Preceded by: Hubert Minnis

Leader of the Free National Movement
- Incumbent
- Assumed office 27 November 2021
- Preceded by: Hubert Minnis
Ministerial positions
Minister of Agriculture and Marine Resources
In office 4 July 2018 – September 2021
Prime Minister	Hubert Minnis
Preceded by	Renward Wells
Succeeded by	Clay Sweeting
Minister of Youth, Sports and Culture
In office 15 May 2017 – 4 July 2018
Prime Minister	Hubert Minnis
Preceded by	Daniel Johnson
Succeeded by	Lanisha Rolle

Member of Parliament for Marco City
- Incumbent
- Assumed office 10 May 2017
- Preceded by: Gregory Moss

Senator
- In office 19 March 2010 – May 2012
- Prime Minister: Hubert Ingraham
- Preceded by: Seat vacant

Senator
- In office June 2014 – 21 March 2016
- Prime Minister: Perry Christie
- Preceded by: John Henry Bostwick

Personal details
- Born: Michael Clifton Pintard; 3 July 1964 (age 62) Nassau, Bahamas
- Party: Free National Movement
- Spouse: Berlice Lightbourne
- Education: College of the Bahamas; Tuskegee University; McGill University

Michael Clifton Pintard (born 3 July 1964) is a Bahamian politician, writer and former playwright who has served as leader of the Free National Movement (FNM) and leader of the Opposition since November 2021. He has represented Marco City constituency in the House of Assembly since the 2017 general election, and earlier served two terms in the Senate of the Bahamas, from 2010 to 2012 and from 2014 to 2016. Pintard has held two Cabinet posts, serving as minister of Youth, Sports and Culture (2017–2018) and as minister of agriculture and marine resources (2018–2021).

Following the FNM's electoral loss in 2021, Pintard was elected as party leader, and led it in Opposition during the first Davis Administration. He was re-elected in Marco City at the 2026 Bahamian general election, but the FNM remained in opposition after winning eight of the 41 seats in the House of Assembly.

Before entering front-line politics, Pintard worked as a human-resources consultant, motivational speaker and cultural producer. He wrote and staged a number of plays and published several books of poetry and political commentary.

== Early life and education ==
Pintard was born on 3 July 1964 in Nassau, the son of Laura Pearline Benson (née Hepburn) and John Samuel Pintard. He received his early education in Nassau and studied agriculture at the College of The Bahamas (now the University of The Bahamas), where he completed an Associate of Arts degree in agriculture.

He went on to earn a Bachelor of Science degree in agronomy from Tuskegee University in Tuskegee, Alabama, and later completed graduate-level courses in agricultural economics at McGill University in Montreal, Canada. Pintard received the James Michener Scholarship to attend the Caribbean Summer Writers Institute at the University of Miami. College of The Bahamas materials describe him as an internationally certified compliance and anti-money laundering officer and a licensed real estate salesman.

== Arts and professional career ==
After completing his studies, Pintard worked as a human resources development consultant, public speaker and writer. Material from the College of The Bahamas describes him as a human resources development consultant who has shared his expertise at conferences and forums in The Bahamas and abroad, including in the United States, Canada, the United Kingdom, Asia and the Caribbean.

He worked mainly through his company Scribes Ltd/Scribes Edutainment, which produced educational and cultural programmes and managed stage productions. In the 1990s and 2000s he wrote and produced a number of plays dealing with social issues such as crime, family conflict and youth violence. These included the drama Not My Child, staged in Freeport, Grand Bahama, in October 2010.

Alongside his creative work, Pintard held a number of corporate and consultancy positions. He served as organisational development manager for the Grand Bahama Airport Company, the Freeport Harbour Company and the Freeport Container Port, and later consulted for clients including Vopak Terminal Bahamas and the ministry responsible for the public service. He also acted as a consultant to the Bahamian government in ministries responsible for economic development, tourism, youth, sports and culture, and hosted the radio talk show The Way Forward on GEMS 105.9 FM in The Bahamas.

Pintard is also a founding partner of Congo Town Development Ltd, a Bahamian property company that focuses on housing projects in urban areas. Together with his business partners he developed the Plumbago Gardens residential project in the Fox Hill district of New Providence.

== Political career ==
=== Senate and early candidacies (2010–2014) ===
Pintard was first appointed to the Senate of the Bahamas on 19 March 2010 by Prime Minister Hubert Ingraham. At the time he was described by Ingraham as an "accomplished playwright and brilliant humorist" as well as a teacher and human-resources consultant. His appointment drew criticism from the opposition Progressive Liberal Party (PLP), which argued that naming a Free National Movement partisan to fill a long-vacant seat was a "clear violation" of a ruling by former Chief Justice Sir Burton Hall on the constitutional provisions governing the three senators appointed on the prime minister's advice after consultation with the leader of the opposition under Article 39(4) of the Bahamian Constitution.

Representing the Free National Movement, he ran unsuccessfully for the Cat Island, Rum Cay & San Salvador constituency in the 2012 general election, losing to then-Progressive Liberal Party deputy leader Philip "Brave" Davis, who received 778 votes (52.57%) to Pintard's 693 (46.82%).

In June 2014 he was again appointed as a Free National Movement senator. He replaced John Henry Bostwick, who was removed from the Senate after refusing to resign over an ammunition possession charge.

=== FNM chairman and Nygård lawsuit controversy (2014–2016) ===
At the FNM's November 2014 convention, Pintard was elected national chairman of the party, part of a new leadership team with party leader Hubert Minnis and deputy leader K. Peter Turnquest. As chairman he frequently sparred with PLP ministers over issues such as alleged conflicts of interest and government oversight of major investment projects.

In 2015–2016 Pintard became involved with the environmental coalition Save The Bays (STB), formed to challenge what it said was unlawful dredging and construction at Canadian fashion mogul Peter Nygård's Lyford Cay estate and backed in part by Nygård's neighbour and long-time adversary, hedge-fund manager Louis Bacon. In March 2016 STB directors and allies filed a civil action in the Supreme Court of the Bahamas alleging that Nygård had financed a campaign of intimidation, including an alleged "murder-for-hire" plot, against Bacon, STB lawyer Fred Smith and other opponents. Affidavits sworn by two self-described gang members, Livingston "Toggie" Bullard and Wisler "Bobo" Davilma, alleged that Nygård had recruited them to carry out criminal acts on behalf of a "hit list". According to press summaries of investigator John DiPaolo's affidavit, the two were later "tracked down with the help of" Pintard, who alerted STB figures to their claims about Nygård and the alleged plot.

Within days Nygård's legal team released counter-affidavits said to have been sworn by Bullard and Davilma in Canada in 2015, in which they alleged that they had in fact been promised US$3 million and paid US$50,000 up front for "false testimony" against Nygård and claimed that a payment meeting at a Nassau hotel attended by Pintard had been secretly recorded. The controversy escalated when audio recordings purporting to capture conversations between Pintard and each man circulated on social media. In one recording, according to an official government newsletter and subsequent press reports, Bullard is heard asking for US$500,000 to sign an affidavit. Political opponents that Pintard's decision to not report the matter to the police was grounds for his resignation as FNM Chairman, while other observers stated that the affair was more damaging to the sitting government than the opposition.

On 21 March 2016, opted to resign as FNM chairman and as a senator as the political scrutiny brought about from his involvement peaked. He described the move as "not an admission of guilt" and rejected suggestions that he had done anything illegal or unethical, saying he had sought to help friends and colleagues get to the bottom of hate rallies and threats against STB. After stepping down from the chairmanship, Pintard remained active within the FNM and delivered speeches criticising both the PLP administration and leadership disputes inside his own party.

=== Member of Parliament and cabinet minister (2017–2021) ===
In the run-up to the 2017 general election, the FNM ratified Pintard as its candidate for the Marco City constituency on Grand Bahama, a swing seat that has been held by both the PLP and the FNM in previous elections. He won the seat at the general election held on 10 May 2017 as the FNM secured a landslide victory over the governing PLP, taking 35 of the 39 seats in the House of Assembly, and was subsequently sworn in as Minister of Youth, Sports and Culture in the Minnis Cabinet later that month.

In July 2018 Prime Minister Hubert Minnis appointed Pintard Minister of Agriculture and Marine Resources. In that role he oversaw fisheries policy and programmes to support farmers, and represented The Bahamas at regional and international agriculture and fisheries forums, including leading the national delegation to the 41st session of the Food and Agriculture Organization in Rome and participating in meetings organised by the Inter-American Institute for Cooperation on Agriculture (IICA) and the Caribbean Agricultural Research and Development Institute (CARDI).

In 2019, after Hurricane Dorian severely affected Abaco and Grand Bahama, Pintard was one of several ministers tasked with assessing and coordinating recovery efforts in the agricultural and marine sectors. He described the damage to agriculture and marine resources in Grand Bahama and Abaco as "catastrophic" and said that preliminary assessments indicated losses of "well in excess of" US$60 million.

One of the most contested measures during Pintard's tenure was the Fisheries Act 2020, which sought to reserve commercial fishing on Bahamian-owned vessels for Bahamian citizens. Pintard defended the measure as a way to protect marine resources and the livelihoods of Bahamian fishermen, while opponents challenged the reforms, arguing that the ban on foreign fishermen was discriminatory, unconstitutional and economically damaging.

During the 2021 budget debate, Pintard also distanced himself from the Minnis administration's controversial Oban Energies heads of agreement, describing the ceremonial signing as "clumsy" and a "rookie's mistake" while rejecting allegations of a corrupt arrangement.

The FNM was defeated by the PLP in the September 2021 general election, winning only seven of the 39 seats in the House of Assembly. Pintard was nevertheless re-elected with 57 percent of the vote cast in Marco City as one of the party's seven MPs.

=== Leader of the Free National Movement and Opposition (2021–present) ===
Following the FNM's electoral defeat, leader and former prime minister Hubert Minnis announced that he would not reoffer for the leadership at the party's planned one-day convention in November 2021. At the convention, held on 27 November, delegates elected Pintard as the FNM's sixth leader, giving him 297 votes (about 67 percent) against rivals Kwasi Thompson (120) and Iram Lewis (44). He was sworn in as Leader of the Opposition in the House of Assembly on 29 November 2021.

As opposition leader, Pintard has focused his parliamentary interventions on the cost of living, fiscal policy, governance and immigration. He has criticised the Davis administration over the pace of implementing freedom of information legislation, public procurement practices and alleged politicisation of the immigration system.

The FNM lost the 2023 West Grand Bahama and Bimini by-election, which Pintard described as a "stress test" for the party organisation. In early 2024 former prime minister Minnis sought to return as FNM leader, triggering a contested leadership race ahead of a one-day convention on 1 June 2024. At the convention Pintard defeated Minnis by 486 votes to 163, securing a renewed mandate from party delegates. Despite a call for unity from party members and elected officials in the days following the convention, media observers noted that relations between Minnis' supporters and Pintard's supporters still appeared strained.

In April 2025 Central Grand Bahama MP Iram Lewis resigned from the FNM and joined the Coalition of Independents, citing an "erosion of trust", "uncertainty" surrounding his candidacy and concern over the party's direction.

As the party moved closer to ratifying candidates for the approaching 2026 elections, Pintard controversially announced that former Prime Minister Hubert Minnis would not be nominated by the party to contest Killarney in the next election, while rejecting assertions that there was no longer a place for his input within the party. Minnis later announced that he would pursue an independent bid for re-election, effectively ending his affiliation with the party he once led to victory less than a decade earlier. Pintard called the decision "unwise" and said it put the former prime minister's legacy at risk.

A few months after, the FNM lost its second by-election in as many years in Golden Isles, which was held after the unexpected death of its incumbent MP at the time, Vaughn Miller.

During the 2026 election campaign, Pintard and the FNM announced a package of policy proposals in its 2026 Manifesto under the theme "We Work For You." The party proposed introducing a national lottery to fund national development, substantial increases to housing construction, upgrades to healthcare capacity and a crackdown on illegal immigration.

The elections resulted in the FNM remaining in opposition after winning eight of the 41 seats in the House of Assembly. Pintard retained Marco City, while deputy leader Shanendon Cartwright lost in St James and party chairman Duane Sands lost in Bamboo Town. Pintard conceded the election after calling Prime Minister Philip Davis to congratulate him on the PLP's victory, saying that the FNM accepted the result and would continue as His Majesty's Loyal Opposition. On 18 May 2026, Pintard was sworn in as Leader of His Majesty's Loyal Opposition for the new Parliament on the recommendation of the party's elected officials.

However, Pintard did not immediately commit to remaining party leader in the long-term, only stating that he would support party members having the ultimate say through a convention. Former deputy prime minister Desmond Bannister, who had previously endorsed Minnis to return as party leader, called on Pintard to resign, arguing that resignation was the traditional response when a party leader lost a national election.

== Writing and publications ==
Pintard has published several works of poetry and non-fiction. His first book, Still Standing: Poetry (1995), is a collection of poems used as an English literature text in Bahamian high schools. Textbook and bookseller descriptions note that it addresses issues such as social inequality, poverty and violence in Bahamian society, including what they describe as the "black crab syndrome".

In 2001 he published Follow Your Dreams, a short inspirational book for young readers described by the College of The Bahamas as an "inspiring piece of literature" and catalogued as Bahamian children's literature, illustrated by artist James O. Rolle.

His 2003 book Politricks: A Confidential Handbook for Politicians, Aspiring Politicians and Political Soldiers, published by Scribes Limited, is described in College of The Bahamas material as a work that takes a humorous yet pointed look at "the games people play in politics". During the 2026 election campaign, Prime Minister Philip Davis and the Progressive Liberal Party quoted several satirical passages from Pintard's book and suggested that the FNM Leader harbored contempt for the Bahamian people.

== Personal life ==
Pintard is married to attorney Berlice Lightbourne. The couple have a daughter, Micaela, and live in Freeport, Grand Bahama. Berlice Lightbourne-Pintard has spoken publicly on issues relating to women in the workplace and has been active in FNM women's organisations.

In May 2023, as Leader of the Opposition, Pintard and his wife attended the Coronation of Charles III and Camilla as part of the official Bahamian delegation led by Prime Minister Philip Davis.

== Bibliography ==
- Pintard, Michael (1995). Still Standing: Poetry. Guanima Press. ISBN 976-9508-40-3.
- Pintard, Michael (2001). Follow Your Dreams. ISBN 976-8108-50-9.
- Pintard, Michael (2003). Politricks: a confidential handbook for politicians, aspiring politicians and political soldiers. Scribes Ltd. ISBN 976-9508-41-1.
