= Vanguard Nationalist and Socialist Party =

The Vanguard Nationalist and Socialist Party was a minor political party in the Bahamas in the 1970s and 1980s.

The party was founded in 1971 by a group belonging to the youth organization of Progressive Liberal Party who were inspired by the Black Panther Party in the United States. In the 1977 elections it put up five candidates, but received only 55 votes and failed to win a seat. John T. McCartney became party president in 1979, and whilst it improved its performance in the 1982 elections, with 18 candidates receiving 181 votes, it still failed to win a seat. The last election contested by the party was the a by-election in St. Barnabas constituency in 1987, which was not contested by the official opposition Free National Movement. The party's candidate was its then-leader, Lionel Carey. Carey came bottom in the poll, below the Workers' Party.

The party was never taken seriously by most Bahamian voters, a fact reflected in their abysmal vote totals. Every single candidate that ever ran on behalf of the party lost their deposit (their 1982 manifesto called for its elimination). Members addressed each other as 'comrade', which was also lampooned.
