= Attorney General Isaacs =

Attorney General Isaacs may refer to:

- Isaac Isaacs (1855–1948), Attorney-General of Australia
- Kendal Isaacs (1925–1996), Attorney General of the Colony of the Bahamas
- Rufus Isaacs, 1st Marquess of Reading (1860–1935), Attorney General for England and Wales
