= Long Island (Bahamas Parliament constituency) =

Bahamas parliamentary constituency

- Constituency
- Long Island on a map of the 2021 election
- District: Long Island, Bahamas
- Electorate: 1,450 (2011); 1,836 (2021)

Current constituency
- Seats: 1
- Party: Free National Movement
- Member: Andre Rollins

Long Island is a parliamentary constituency represented in the House of Assembly of the Bahamas. It elects one member of parliament (MP) using the first past the post electoral system. It has been represented by Andre Rollins from the Free National Movement since 2026. It was previously held by Adrian Gibson since 2021.

== Geography ==
The constituency consists of the districts of Long Island.

== Members of Parliament ==
Election	Parliament	Candidate	Party
2002	10th Bahamian Parliament	Lawrence Cartwright	Free National Movement
2007	11th Bahamian Parliament	Lawrence Cartwright	Free National Movement
2012	12th Bahamian Parliament	Loretta Butler-Turner	Free National Movement
2017	13th Bahamian Parliament	Adrian Gibson	Free National Movement
2021	14th Bahamian Parliament	Adrian Gibson	Free National Movement
2026	15th Bahamian Parliament	Andre Rollins	Free National Movement

== Election results ==
2021
Party	Candidate	Votes	%	±%
FNM	Adrian Gibson	728	54.90	▲1.90
PLP	Tyrel Young	574	43.29	▲11.29
United Coalition Movement	Sidney Caroll	16	1.21	
Independent	Shakeil Adderley	8	0.60	
Turnout		1,326	72.22	
FNM hold				

== See also ==
- Constituencies of the Bahamas
