= Arinthia Komolafe =

Bahamian politician (born 1980)

Arinthia S. Komolafe
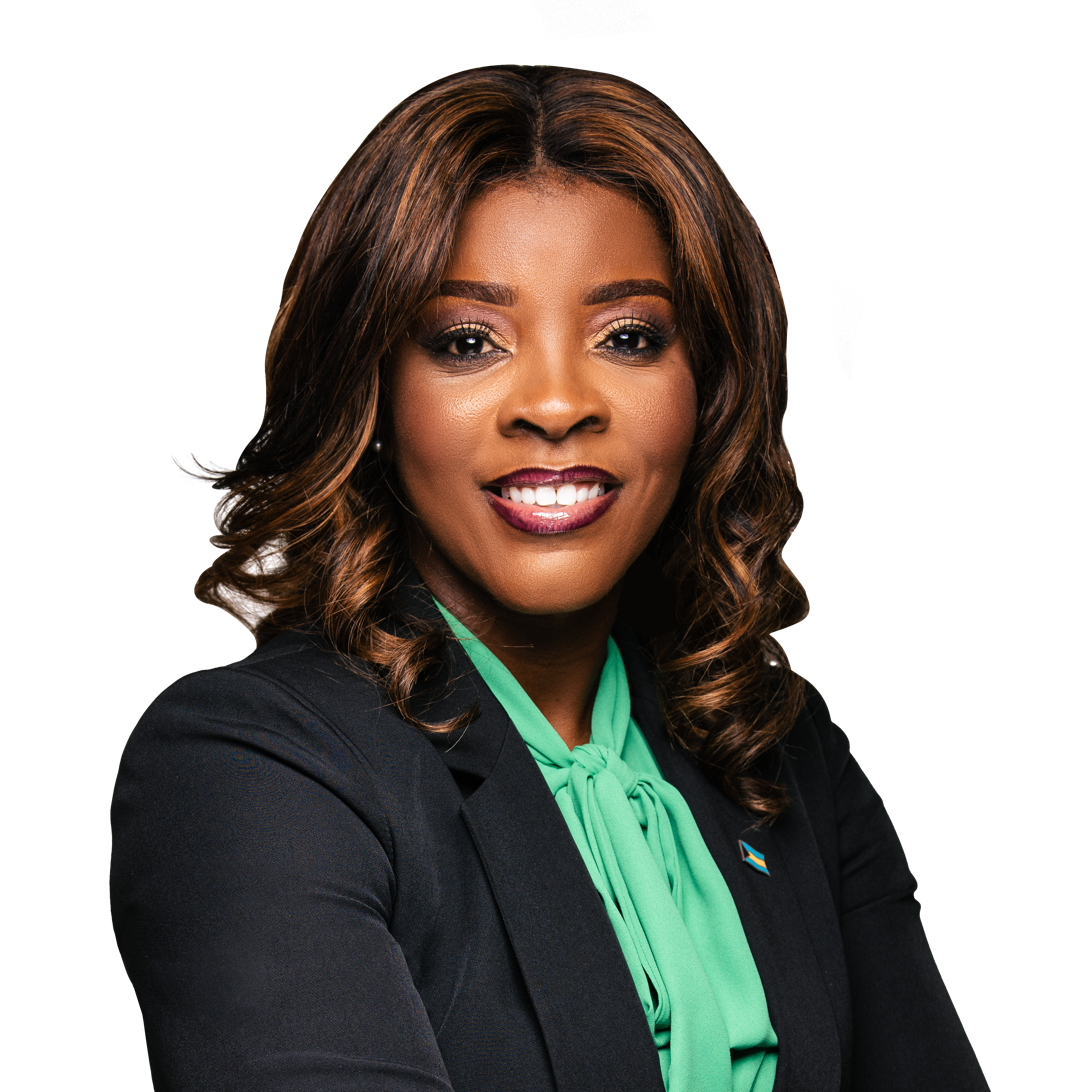

3rd Leader of the Democratic National Alliance
- Incumbent
- Assumed office 22 February 2019
- Deputy: Buscheme (Busch) Armbrister
- Preceded by: W. A. Branville McCartney; Christopher A. Mortimer

Personal details
- Born: Arinthia Santina Braynen; 30 June 1980 (age 45) Nassau, Bahamas
- Citizenship: The Bahamas
- Party: Democratic National Alliance
- Spouse: Emmanuel Komolafe (m. 2005)
- Children: Morgan, Alexandria, Joshua
- Parent(s): Bradley Braynen & Jenniffer Braynen (nee Harvey)
- Education: C.R. Walker Secondary School
- Alma mater: University of Buckingham
- Profession: Attorney; banker; consultant; politician
- Website: askomolafe.com

Arinthia Santina Komolafe (née Braynen, born 30 June 1980) is a Bahamian politician and the former Leader of the Democratic National Alliance (DNA), one of the three main political parties in the Bahamas.

== Early life and education ==
Komolafe was born on 30 June 1980 at Princess Margaret Hospital in Nassau, Bahamas. Komolafe was the second of five children of Bradley Arthur Braynen, a civil servant, and Jenniffer Elaine Braynen (née Harvey) a retired banker and consultant.

Komolafe was educated at Willard Patton Primary School and C.R. Walker Secondary High School. She earned a Bachelors of Law from the University of Buckingham in England and successfully completed the Society of Trust & Estate Practitioners (STEP) program in 2010.

== Business career ==
In September 2013, Komolafe became the first female Managing Director at the Bahamas Development Bank. She served in the post up to March 2016. During her tenure, Komolafe presided over a "no sacred cows" policy which ensured that political cronies and beneficiaries of nepotism were not spared from being pursued for funds owed to the bank.

Komolafe was nominated for the U.S. State's Department Global Leadership Mentorship Program for leadership that made a difference to the Bahamas.

== Political career ==
=== Chairperson of the Women's Branch ===
In 2012, Komolafe was elected as the Chairperson of the New Providence Women's Branch of the Progressive Liberal Party, having previously served as the Secretary of the Women's Branch. During her tenure, Komolafe led a delegation of women to their first meeting at the 57th Session of the Commission on the Status of Women meeting at the United Nations in March 2013.

=== 2017 General Election ===
In January 2017, Komolafe was ratified as a candidate for the Democratic National Alliance in the Killarney constituency and served as the Spokesperson for Financial Services, Trade and Industry and National Insurance in the DNA's shadow cabinet. She was one of thirteen women on the Party's ticket. She was nominated as the candidate for the Killarney constituency for the 2017 General Elections. She ran opposite the leader of the Free National Movement, Dr. Hubert Minnis.

Minnis won the seat for a third consecutive time, securing 4,163 votes, and went on to become the fourth Prime Minister of the Bahamas. Komolafe secured 422 votes after only four months on the campaign trail - the highest of all the DNA female candidates and the third highest of DNA candidates of the 35 candidates fielded by the DNA.

Killarney Constituency 2017 General Elections Results
Party	Candidate	Votes	%
Democratic National Alliance	Arinthia S. Komolafe	422	7
Progressive Liberal Party	Reneika D. Knowles	1087	19
Free National Movement	Dr. Hubert A. Minnis	4163	73

=== Party Leadership ===
At a special meeting held on 24 October 2017, Arinthia Komolafe was elected as Deputy Leader of the Democratic National Alliance. She succeeded Christopher Mortimer, who had been appointed Interim Leader. following the DNA's defeat in the 2017 General Election in which the Party failed to win a single seat in the House of Assembly. She announced her intention to seek the Leadership of the DNA on 19 February 2019, and went on to defeat fellow challenger Kendal Smith by a decisive 6:1 margin. In doing so, Komolafe became the first female leader of the DNA political party, joining other prominent female leaders, such as such as Cynthia Pratt, former Deputy Leader of the Progressive Liberal Party (PLP) and Loretta Butler-Turner, former Deputy Leader of the Free National Movement.

== Personal life ==
In 2005, Arinthia married Emmanuel Komolafe, whom she had met at the University of Buckingham in 2001. The couple have two daughters and one son. Her elder brother, Brandon, died in 2016.

According to financial declarations, Arinthia Komolafe has assets worth more than one million US dollars (2021).

== Selected writings ==
Arinthia Komolafe wrote a weekly column in the Nassau Guardian for five years, from 2012 to 2017. The articles, which addressed political and socio-economic issues facing the Bahamas, included:

- "The Bahamian Dream pt.1", The Nassau Guardian, 20 January 2012.
- "The Bahamian Dream: Part 2", The Bahamas Weekly, 9 February 2012.
- "Self-Imposed Austerity Measures Advisable for Next Government", The Bahamas Weekly, 11 January 2012.
- "A Call to National Conscience", The Bahamas Weekly, 4 May 2012
- "Bahamian Governance: The Age of Prudence", The Bahamas Weekly, 5 February 2013
- "The Changing of the Guard", The Bahamas Weekly, 30 April 2012
- "No Cross No Crown - The Cost of Leadership", The Bahamas Weekly 12 April 2012
- "Jamaican Elections 2011: A prediction of what to expect in The Bahamas in 2012", The Bahamas Weekly 2 January 2012

== See also ==
In 2014, Arinthia S. Komolafe served as one of the featured speakers in the 2nd Annual Eleuthera Business Outlook (EBO) on April 24, 2014:

- "Chamber Chief Optimistic About Eleuthera's Economic Future", The Bahamas Weekly, 16 April 2014:

In 2018, Komolafe was selected to participate in the U.S. State Department exchange program in 2018, focusing on the U.S. electoral process:

- "Bahamian politician selected to participate in U.S. State Department Exchange program", The Bahamas Weekly, 8 November 2018:
