= Adrian Gibson (Bahamian politician) =

Bahamian politician

Member of the Parliament of the Bahamas for Long Island
- Incumbent
- Assumed office 2017

Personal details
- Political party: Free National Movement

Adrian Gibson (born 1985) is a Bahamian politician from the Free National Movement.

== Career ==
Gibson was elected MP in 2017 and re-elected in 2021.

In 2022, he was charged with corruption.

== See also ==
- 14th Bahamian Parliament
