= Komolafe =

Kọ́mọláfẹ́
- Gender: Male
- Language: Yoruba

Origin
- Origin: Nigerian
- Meaning: Teach the child the art of fancy/fashion.
- Region of origin: South West, Nigeria

Kọ́mọláfẹ́ is a male-given Yoruba name commonly used as a surname in Nigeria. It means "Teach the child the art of fancy/fashion." Its full form is Akọ́mọláfẹ́ which means (We teach the child the art of fancy/fashion.) Kọ́mọláfẹ́ is common among the Ibadan people of the Southwest, Nigeria and is considered a name of great respect and reverence.

== Notable individuals with the name ==
- Arinthia Komolafe (born 1980), Bahamian politician
- Bisi Komolafe (1986–2012), Nigerian actress and film producer
- Gbenga Komolafe (born 1963), Nigerian lawyer and engineer
- Paul Komolafe (born 2000), Nigerian football
- Yewande Komolafe, Nigerian food writer
