= Cecil Wallace-Whitfield =

Bahamian Minister of Education (1930–1990)

Sir Cecil Wallace Whitfield

Leader of the Free National Movement
- In office 20 October 1971 – 20 September 1972
- Preceded by: (position created)
- Succeeded by: Kendal Isaacs
- In office 20 June 1987 – 9 May 1990
- Preceded by: Kendal Isaacs
- Succeeded by: Hubert Ingraham

Personal details
- Born: Cecil Vincent Wallace Whitfield; 20 March 1930 Nassau, British Bahamas
- Died: 9 May 1990 (aged 60) Miami, Florida, US

Sir Cecil Vincent Wallace Whitfield (20 March 1930 – 9 May 1990) was a Bahamian national, politician, and a founding member and first leader of the Free National Movement political party. He also served as a Minister in the cabinet of Lynden Pindling from 1967 to 1970 and as a longtime member of the Bahamian Parliament.

== Early life ==
Cecil Vincent Wallace Whitfield was born on 20 March 1930 in Nassau to Kenneth Whitfield and Dorothy Wallace. He studied at the Government High School. He was a customs officer before studying law at University of Hull.

== Career ==
Originally a custom's officer, Wallace Whitfield started his political career in the early 1950s when he joined the Progressive Liberal Party (PLP). In 1967 he was Chairman of the PLP and joined the House of Assembly as an MP representing the St. Agnes constituency as a representative for the PLP.

In January 1967, Wallace Whitfield was selected to join Lynden Pindling's cabinet during his term as Premier, first serving as Minister of Works before serving as Minister of Education and later Culture. He had a key role in developing infrastructure throughout The Bahamas, particularly in the "over-the-hill" communities in New Providence in the late 1960s.

When Pindling was elected as the Bahamas' first Prime Minister in 1969, Wallace Whitfield rejoined Pindling's cabinet as Minister of Education. While Minister of Education, he initiated a massive school construction project to help develop the Bahamian education system. However, during Pindling's term as Prime Minister, Wallace Whitfield remained an outspoken critic of Pindling and his perceived authoritarianism. This led to his resignation from the cabinet and the PLP in 1970.

=== Free National Movement ===
In late 1970, Wallace Whitfield and a group of seven other former MPs from the PLP known as the "Dissident Eight", which included Arthur Foulkes, formed a breakaway political party called the Free Progressive Liberal Party. Wallace Whitfield called on all parties in opposition to Pindling to disband, which led to the disbandment of the United Bahamian Party (UBP). On October 20, 1971, the Dissident Eight and several former members of the UBP met at Spring Hills Farms in Fox Hill, Nassau, where they formed a new independent center-right political party called the Free National Movement (FNM). In 1971, he stood as Leader of the Opposition in the Bahamas.

Wallace-Whitfield was selected as the first leader of the Free National Movement, which he served as until 1972. Under his leadership, the FNM won nine seats in Parliament in the 1972 election, however Wallace-Whitfield himself was not elected. As a result, he was replaced as leader of the FNM by Kendal Isaacs.

After a long string of parliamentary defeats between 1973 and 1977, the FNM split into two opposing factions: the FNM and the Bahamian Democratic Party (BDP). Wallace Whitfield took control of the FNM, while John Henry Bostwick took control of the BDP. When the FNM reunified in 1980, Wallace Whitfield was again replaced by Kendal Isaacs, who led the party in the 1982 election. Wallace-Whitfield served as an MP for the FNM until his death in 1990.

Following the 1987 election, Isaacs resigned as leader of the FNM. Wallace Whitfield was elected as his replacement, and led the FNM until his death, being replaced by Hubert Ingraham.

== Personal life and death ==
Wallace-Whitfield died at a hospital in Miami on 9 May 1990 and was buried at St. Matthew's Anglican Church in Nassau. He had a wife named Daphne.

== Honors ==
Wallace Whitfield was knighted in 1987 for his services to the Bahamas. He was posthumously awarded Order of the National Hero in 2018. His face is featured on all five-dollar Bahamian dollar bills. The Cecil Wallace Whitfield Centre corporate complex in Nassau which houses the Ministry of Finance and Office of the Prime Minister is named in his honor. The Free National Movement Headquarters in Grand Bahama is also named the Cecil Wallace Whitfield Centre.
