= Alfred Sears =

Bahamian politician

The Hon. Alfred Sears M.P.
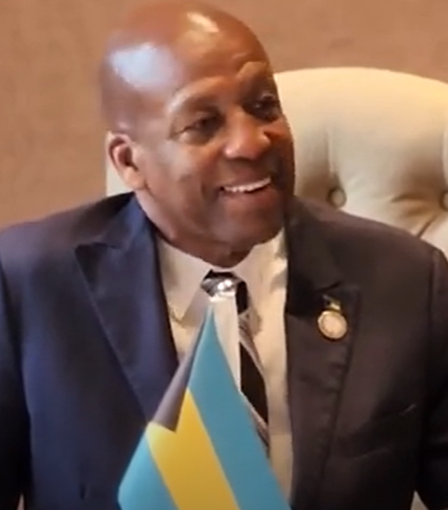

Minister of Immigration and National Insurance
- Incumbent
- Assumed office 4 September 2023
- Prime Minister: Philip Davis
- Preceded by: Keith Bell (Labour and Immigration)

Minister of Public Works and Utilities
- In office 23 September 2021 – 4 September 2023
- Preceded by: Desmond Bannister
- Succeeded by: Pia Glover-Rolle (Labour and Public Service)

Attorney General and Minister of Legal Affairs
- In office 2002–2006
- Preceded by: Carl Bethel
- Succeeded by: Allyson Maynard Gibson

Minister of Education, Science and Technology
- In office 2002–2007
- Preceded by: Dion Foulkes (Education, Youth, and Sports)
- Succeeded by: Carl Bethel (Education, Youth, Sports and Culture)

Member of Parliament for Fort Charlotte
- In office 23 September 2021 – 8 April 2026
- Preceded by: Mark Humes
- Succeeded by: to be elected
- In office 2000–2012
- Preceded by: Zhivargo Laing
- Succeeded by: Andre Rollins

Personal details
- Party: Progressive Liberal Party
- Spouse: Marion Bethel
- Children: 3 (Adelaja, Ifedayo, Nia)
- Education: Norman Manley Law School; New York Law School; Columbia University

Alfred Michael Sears is a Bahamian Progressive Liberal Party politician, lawyer, and educator serving as the Minister of Immigration and National Insurance since 2023. He also serves as the Member of Parliament for Fort Charlotte, a position he has held from 2021 to 2026.

Previously, Sears served as an MP for Fort Charlotte from 2002 to 2012, the Attorney-General from 2002 to 2006, the Minister of Education, Science and Technology from 2002 to 2007, and the Minister of Public Works and Utilities from 2021 to 2023.

== Education ==
Sears holds a Certificate of Legal Education from Norman Manley Law School, a Juris Doctor degree from New York Law School, a Bachelor of Arts in political science and a Master of Philosophy in international relations both from Columbia University.

== Career ==
Prior to being elected to parliament in 2002, Sears was an educator and lecturer for Caribbean Politics and International Relations at Hunter College, City University of New York from 1976 to 1992. He also taught Labour Law, Business Law and Hospitality Law as an adjunct lecturer in Nassau for the University of the West Indies, Florida International University and Nova Southeastern University from 1992 to 2002. Sears was also a lawyer who was experience in commercial, criminal, corporate, and civil litigation.

=== Parliamentary Career (2002-2012) ===
Sears was first elected to Parliament in 2002, defeating FNM Incumbent Zhivargo Laing.

He was appointed Minister of Education, Science and Technology by Prime Minister Perry Christie. As Minister, he was responsible for improvements in literacy education, the creation of the Fort Charlotte Community Development Center, and the construction of the T.G. Glover Primary School.

As a Member of Parliament Sears was also Chairman of the Caribbean Financial Action Task Force from 2003 to 2004.

Sears was also appointed the Attorney General of the Bahamas, serving from 2002 to 2006.

Sears did not stand for re-election in 2012 and was replaced by Dr. Andre Rollins on the election ballot.

=== Chairman of the College of the Bahamas ===
In 2012, Sears was appointed the Chairman of the College of the Bahamas. While there, he was responsible for the college's transitions into the University of the Bahamas. He resigned from his chairmanship in 2016.

=== 2017 Parliament Candidacy ===
Sears ran for leadership of the PLP; he lost to Perry Christie. Sears ran for his old Fort Charlotte seat in 2017. He lost to FNM candidate Mark Humes.

=== Parliamentary Career (2021-present) ===
Sears was re-elected to parliament in a rematch against Mark Humes in 2021.

As a member of Parliament, he was appointed Minister of Public Works and Utilities by Prime Minister Philip "Brave" Davis. As minister, Sears oversaw infrastructure and roadwork development.

In a 2023 cabinet reshuffle, Sears was appointed Minister of Intelligence and National Insurance.

On 11 June 2025, he announced he would stand down at the 2026 Bahamian general election.

== Personal life ==
Sears is married to Marion Bethel, a lawyer and poet. They have 3 children: Adelaja, Ifedayo, and Nia.
