= Andre Rollins =

Bahamian politician

Member of Parliament for Long Island
- Incumbent
- Assumed office 12 May 2026
- Preceded by: Adrian Gibson

Member of Parliament for Fort Charlotte
- In office 2012–2017
- Preceded by: Alfred Sears
- Succeeded by: Mark Humes

Personal details
- Party: Free National Movement (since 2015)
- Other party: Progressive Liberal Party (until 2015)
- Education: Tufts University
- Alma mater: University of Miami School of Law

S. Andre Rollins is a Bahamian politician from the Free National Movement (FNM). He was elected member of the House of Assembly for Long Island in 2026. He was previously MP for Fort Charlotte.

== Biography ==
Rollins graduated from Tufts University and the University of Miami School of Law. Rollins is an orthodontic practitioner.

Rollins crossed the floor from the Progressive Liberal Party (PLP) to the FNM in 2015.

== See also ==
- 15th Bahamian Parliament
