= Ronald Duncombe =

Bahamian politician

Member of the Senate of the Bahamas
- Incumbent
- Assumed office 6 October 2021

Personal details
- Party: Progressive Liberal Party

Ronald "Roni" Duncombe is a Bahamian politician from the Progressive Liberal Party (PLP).

== Career ==
Duncombe was the PLP candidate for Killarney in the 2021 Bahamian general election. He was chair of Nassau Flight Services.
