= 1972 Bahamian general election =

- 19 September 1972

All 38 seats in the House of Assembly 20 seats needed for a majority
- Registered: 57,071
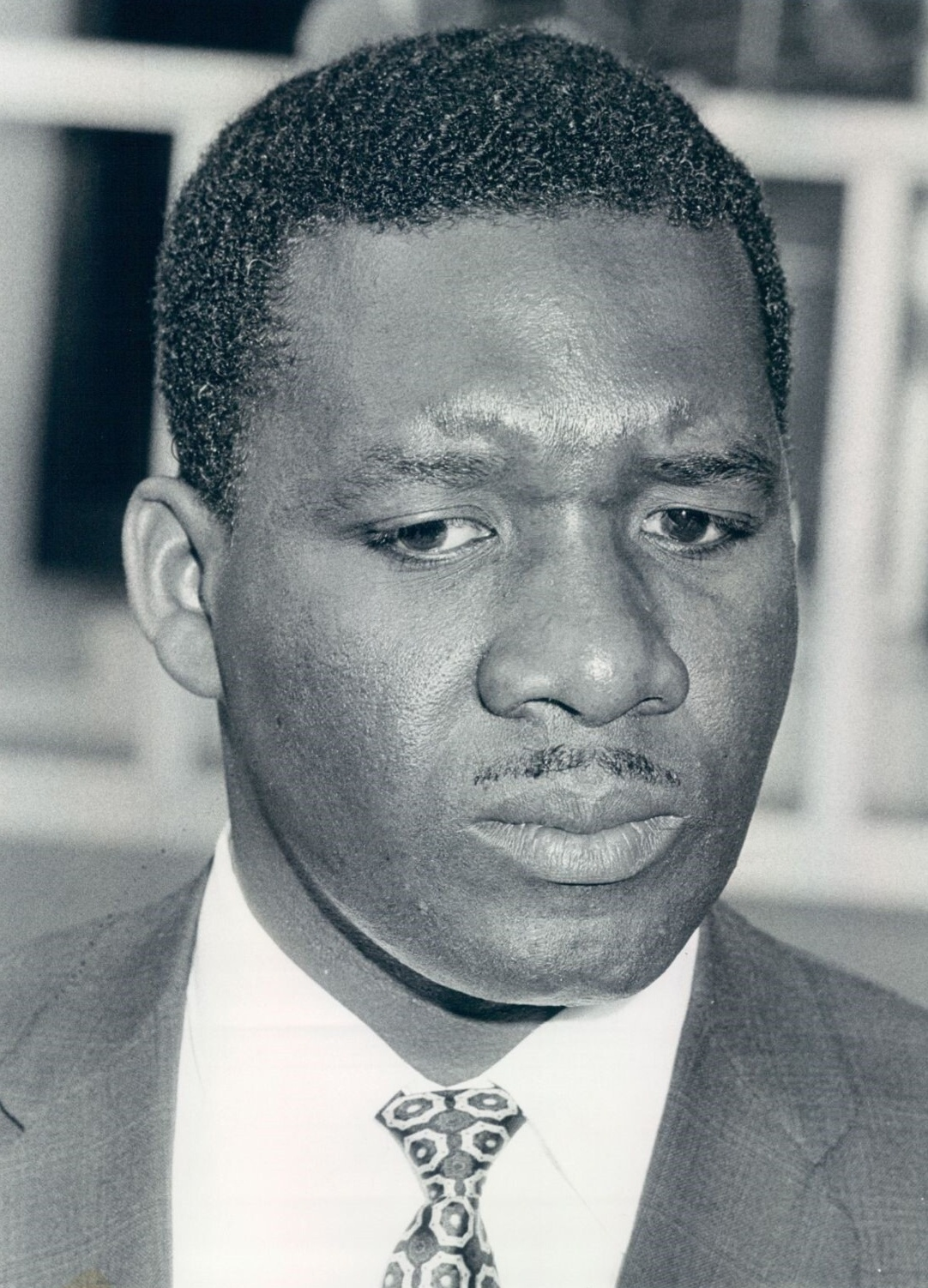

	First party	Second party
Leader	Lynden Pindling	Cecil Wallace-Whitfield
Party	PLP	FNM
Leader's seat	Andros – Kemps Bay	None
Last election	66.51%, 18 seats	28.22%, 7 seats
Seats won	29	9
Seat change	Steady	▲2
Popular vote	29,628	19,736
Percentage	59.00%	39.30%
Swing	▼7.51pp	▲11.08pp
Prime Minister before election
Lynden Pindling
PLP
Elected Prime Minister
Lynden Pindling
PLP

General elections were held in the Bahamas on 19 September 1972. The result was a victory for the Progressive Liberal Party, which won 57.9% of the vote and 29 of the 38 seats.

== Results ==
Party	Votes	%	Seats	+/–
Progressive Liberal Party	29,628	59.00	29	0
Free National Movement	19,736	39.30	9	+2
Commonwealth Labour Party	254	0.51	0	New
Independents	598	1.19	0	–1
Total	50,216	100.00	38	0
Registered voters/turnout	57,071	–		
Source: Caribbean Elections

== Elected MPs ==
#	Name	Party	District	Ethnicity
1	Cleophas Adderley	Free National Movement	New Providence – Nassau City	Black
2	R.F.A. Roberts	Progressive Liberal Party	New Providence East - Centreville	Black
3	Roland Symonette	Free National Movement	New Providence East - Shirlea	White
4	Arlington Butler	Progressive Liberal Party	New Providence East – Culmerville	Black
5	Arthur Hanna	Progressive Liberal Party	New Providence East – Anns Town	Black
6	S.L. Bowe	Progressive Liberal Party	New Providence East – Free Town	Black
7	Kendal Isaacs	Free National Movement	New Providence East – Fort Montagu	Black
8	L.L. Davis	Progressive Liberal Party	New Providence East – Fox Hill	Black
9	C.C. Armbrister	Progressive Liberal Party	New Providence West - Killarney	Black
10	Clement T. Maynard	Progressive Liberal Party	New Providence West - Gambier	Black
11	E.V. Thompson	Progressive Liberal Party	New Providence West – Fort Charlotte	Black
12	Milo Butler	Progressive Liberal Party	New Providence West – Bains Town	Black
13	B.C. Braynen	Progressive Liberal Party	New Providence South – St. Agnes	Black
14	F.R. Wilson	Progressive Liberal Party	New Providence South – Grants Town	Black
15	A.T. Maycock	Progressive Liberal Party	New Providence South – Fort Fincastle	Black
16	George Mackey	Progressive Liberal Party	New Providence South – St. Michaels	Black
17	S.S. Outten	Progressive Liberal Party	New Providence South – St. Barnabas	Black
18	Clifford Darling	Progressive Liberal Party	New Providence South - Englerston	Black
19	E.S. Moxey	Progressive Liberal Party	New Providence South – Coconut Grove	Black
20	Carlton Francis	Progressive Liberal Party	New Providence South – South Beach	Black
21	H.J. Bowden	Progressive Liberal Party	Grand Bahama – West End & Bimini	Black
22	K.W. Nottage	Progressive Liberal Party	Grand Bahama	Black
23	Loftus Roker	Progressive Liberal Party	Andros – Nicholls Town & Berry Islands	Black
24	D.E. Rolle	Progressive Liberal Party	Andros – Mangrove Cay	Black
25	Lynden Pindling	Progressive Liberal Party	Andros – Kemps Bay	Black
26	S.C. Bootle	Progressive Liberal Party	Abaco – Coopers Town	Black
27	E.W.I. Watkins	Free National Movement	Abaco – Marsh Harbour	Black
28	Norman Solomon	Free National Movement	Harbour Island – St. George & Dunmore Town	White
29	Noel Roberts	Free National Movement	Harbour Island – St. Johns	White
30	P.M. Bethel	Progressive Liberal Party	Eleuthera – Governors Harbour	Black
31	Preston Albury	Progressive Liberal Party	Eleuthera – Rock Sound	Black
32	O.N. Johnson	Progressive Liberal Party	Cat Island	Black
33	George Smith	Progressive Liberal Party	Exuma – Rolleville	White
34	Livingston Coakley	Progressive Liberal Party	Exuma – George Town & Ragged Island	Black
35	Cyril Fountain	Free National Movement	Long Island – North Long Island, Rum Cay & San Salvador	White
36	Mike Lightbourn	Free National Movement	Long Island – Clarence Town	White
37	C.F. Tynes	Free National Movement	Crooked Islands, Long Cay, & Acklins	Black
38	J.R. Ford	Progressive Liberal Party	Mayaguana & Inagua Islands	Black
Source: Hughes
