= Marco City =

Town in Bahamas

- Town
- Location within Bahamas
- Coordinates: 26.523361°N 78.673237°W
- Country: Bahamas
- Island: Grand Bahama

Population (2022)
  - Total: 10,305
- Time zone: UTC-5 (Eastern Time Zone)
- Area code: 242

Marco City is a district in the Bahamas located on the island of Grand Bahama.

== History ==
In 2024, Mayfield Park was dedicated as a new hero’s park.

== Governance ==
For elections to the Parliament of the Bahamas, Marco City is part of the Marco City constituency.
