= Commonwealth Labour Party (Bahamas) =

The Commonwealth Labour Party was a minor political party in the Bahamas.

== History ==
The party was established by Assembly member Randol Fawkes. It nominated eight candidates for the 1972 general elections, but received only 254 votes and failed to win a seat. Fawkes revived the party to contest a by-election in St Barnabas constituency in 1974, but finished third behind Sidney Outten and Arthur Foulkes.
