= Naomi Seymour =

Bahamian politician (1938–2024)

Member of the Bahamian Senate
- In office 1990s–1990s

Personal details
- Born: 12 August 1938
- Died: 20 September 2024 (aged 86)
- Children: 2 (including Zhivargo Laing)

Naomi Seymour (12 August 1938 – 20 September 2024) was a Bahamian politician who served as a member of the Bahamian Senate in the 1990s.

== Personal life and death ==
Her son Zhivargo Laing served as a cabinet minister and member of the house of assembly. Her other son Stephen Derick Seymour died in 2011.

Seymour died on 20 September 2024, at the age of 86.
