= Bahamas Democratic Movement =

Bahamian political party

- Abbreviation: BDM
- Leader: Cassius Stuart
- Founded: 1998 (Original); 6 July 2020 (Revived)
- Dissolved: 13 April 2011 (Original)
- Ideology: Liberalism; Populism

The Bahamas Democratic Movement (BDM) is a liberal-populist political party in the Bahamas representing the interests of young people.

== Party formation of Bahamas Democratic Movement ==
The party was formed in late 1998 in Nassau, Bahamas and was officially launched in February 2000. The party's founders included: Cassius Stuart, Howard R. Johnson, Dario Roberts, George Carey and a number of then-students of the College of the Bahamas. The party was formed due to a shared belief held by the founding group that many Caribbean governments, specifically successive Bahamian governments, failed to incorporate young persons (under the age of 30) in the decision-making processes of government at any level. This particular view stemmed from the fact that, at the time, over 60% of the country's population was under the age of 30 years. Stuart and his followers believed that it was incumbent upon the government to have young persons play a more significant role in the governance of the country as opposed to merely "using them for their votes" in the period leading up to general elections. Immediately following victory at the polls, however, Stuart and his followers contended that young persons were given no official governmental roles with any real political power. The current leader of the BDM is Cassius Stuart. Omar Smith serves as Deputy Leader of the party.

== Party split ==
Within a year of the party's formation, Johnson, Carey, Roberts and others left the BDM, citing methodological differences with Stuart as the primary reason for their departure. Soon after their departure, Johnson, Carey, Roberts and others joined the Coalition for Democratic Reform (CDR), a different party.

== The Mace incident ==
On 3 December 2001, Stuart and Smith dominated the national news when they intentionally disrupted the Sitting of the House of Assembly. Both men charged from the Public Gallery onto the House floor and handcuffed themselves to the Mace – a symbol of the House Speaker's authority – in protest against the "unfair gerrymandering of the constituency boundaries by the FNM Administration". The Mace was unable to be separated from the men and, thus, the Sitting had to be suspended. The pair were jailed for almost two days but no charges were brought against them. Ironically, the BDM's Mace Incident was strikingly similar to an event of important political significance in Bahamian history known as Black Tuesday. On that particular day, 27 April 1965, then-leader of the opposition and former Prime Minister, Sir Lynden Pindling threw the Mace out of the House of Assembly window in protest against the unfair gerrymandering of constituency boundaries of the then United Bahamian Party (UBP) government.

== 2002 general elections ==
The BDM contested 12 of the 40 parliamentary seats in the general elections of 2002, winning no seats and less than 1% of the total votes cast. Despite its poor performance at the polls, the BDM enjoys widespread admiration as well as criticism from the Bahamian public. Their support comes mainly from individuals under the age of 30. To date, the BDM has been unable to effectively mobilize and organize the under 30 group to show up at the polls and support the party. Critics of the BDM claim that Stuart and Smith often engage in radical political action to 'grandstand' and claim that this behavior ultimately precludes the organization from fading into obscurity.

== Prime Minister blocked from entering Parliament ==
On 24 March 2005, Stuart and Smith again dominated the national news when they briefly prevented Prime Minister Perry Christie from accessing the House of Assembly. It was a dramatic end to a protest taking place in the immediate vicinity of the Parliament against the government's move to bring a resolution to Parliament, giving a government Member of Parliament (MP) more time to appeal a bankruptcy order against them. The BDM claimed that the government would be abusing its constitutional authority in passing the resolution. This argument had its basis on a requirement, in the Constitution of The Bahamas, that any MP who is declared bankrupt by the Courts must vacate his or her seat in the Parliament. Stuart and Smith were again arrested in the wake of the incident but the pair has yet to be charged before the Bahamian courts.

== Party dissolved ==
On 13 April 2011, the party dissolved its constitution to join forces with the then-governing Free National Movement led by Rt. Hon Hubert Ingraham. Stuart contested the Bamboo town Seat for the Free National Movement but fell short by 340 votes of a win over Renward Wells. Six months after joining the Free National Movement, Stuart left the party because he didn't believe in the new leadership of the party under Hubert Minnis.

== Party revived ==
On 6 July 2020, after nine years outside of the political arena, Cassius Stuart expressed the need for the party to return to the political scene. Much like before, the party claims that there is no clear direction for the country on the part of the government and has been critical of Hubert Minnis, claiming he shows weak national leadership. Stuart was the party leader and Ivan Thompson was announced as the chairman.
