= 1977 Bahamian general election =

General election

General elections were held in the Bahamas on 19 July 1977. The result was a victory for the Progressive Liberal Party, which won 30 of the 38 seats. Voter turnout was 92.6%.

== Results ==
Party	Votes	%	Seats	+/–
Progressive Liberal Party	35,090	54.74	30	+1
Bahamian Democratic Party	17,252	26.91	6	New
Free National Movement	9,995	15.59	2	–7
Vanguard Nationalist and Socialist Party	55	0.09	0	New
Independents	1,716	2.68	0	–1
Total	64,108	100.00	38	0
Valid votes	64,108	100.00		
Invalid/blank votes	0	0.00		
Total votes	64,108	100.00		
Registered voters/turnout	71,295	89.92		
Source: Hughes, Nohlen

=== Elected MPs ===
#	Name	Party	District	Ethnicity
1	Perry Christie	Progressive Liberal Party	New Providence East - Centreville	Black
2	Roland Symonette	Bahamian Democratic Party	New Providence East - Shirlea	White
3	David Knowles	Progressive Liberal Party	New Providence East - Salem	Black
4	Arthur Hanna	Progressive Liberal Party	New Providence East – Anns Town	Black
5	Milo B. Butler	Progressive Liberal Party	New Providence East - Pinedale	Black
6	John Henry Bostwick	Bahamian Democratic Party	New Providence East - Montagu	Black
7	Frank Edgecombe	Progressive Liberal Party	New Providence East – Fox Hill	Black
8	P.D. Pinder	Progressive Liberal Party	New Providence West - Delaporte	Black
9	Paul Adderley	Progressive Liberal Party	New Providence West - Carmichael	Black
10	Clement T. Maynard	Progressive Liberal Party	New Providence West – Yellow Elder	Black
11	V. Grimes	Progressive Liberal Party	New Providence West – Fort Charlotte	Black
12	N.R. Gay	Progressive Liberal Party	New Providence West – Bains Town	Black
13	B.C. Braynen	Progressive Liberal Party	New Providence South – St. Agnes	Black
14	S.A. Morris	Progressive Liberal Party	New Providence South – Grants Town	Black
15	A.T. Maycock	Progressive Liberal Party	New Providence South – Fort Fincastle	Black
16	George Macky	Progressive Liberal Party	New Providence South – St. Michaels	Black
17	S.S. Outten	Progressive Liberal Party	New Providence South – St. Barnabas	Black
18	Clifford Darling	Progressive Liberal Party	New Providence South - Englerston	Black
19	L. Minnis	Progressive Liberal Party	New Providence South – Bamboo Town	Black
20	E. Glinton	Progressive Liberal Party	New Providence South – South Beach	Black
21	H.J. Bowden	Progressive Liberal Party	Grand Bahama – West End & Bimini	Black
22	Garnet Levarty	Free National Movement	Grand Bahama – Pine Ridge	Black
23	Maurice E. Moore	Free National Movement	Grand Bahama – High Rock	Black
24	Loftus Roker	Progressive Liberal Party	Andros – Nicholls Town & Berry Islands	Black
25	D.E. Rolle	Progressive Liberal Party	Andros – Mangrove Cay	Black
26	Lynden Pindling	Progressive Liberal Party	Andros – Kemps Bay	Black
27	Hubert Ingraham	Progressive Liberal Party	Abaco – Coopers Town	Black
28	Mike Lightbourn	Bahamian Democratic Party	Abaco – Marsh Harbour	White
29	Norman Solomon	Bahamian Democratic Party	Harbour Island – St. John	White
30	P.M. Bethel	Progressive Liberal Party	Eleuthera – Governors Harbour	Black
31	Preston Albury	Progressive Liberal Party	Eleuthera – Rock Sound	Black
32	E. Knowles	Bahamian Democratic Party	Cat Island	Black
33	George Smith	Progressive Liberal Party	Exuma – Rolleville	White
34	Livingston Coakley	Progressive Liberal Party	Exuma – George Town & Ragged Island	Black
35	P.P. Smith	Progressive Liberal Party	Long Island – North End	Black
36	James Knowles	Bahamian Democratic Party	Long Island – Clarence Town	White
37	W.A. Moss	Progressive Liberal Party	Crooked Islands, Long Cay, & Acklins	Black
38	J.R. Ford	Progressive Liberal Party	Mayaguana & Inagua Islands	Black
Source: Hughes
