= Greg Moss (Bahamian politician) =

Bahamian politician

Member of the Parliament of the Bahamas for Marco City
- In office 2012–2017
- Preceded by: Zhivargo Laing
- Succeeded by: Michael Pintard

Personal details
- Party: Progressive Liberal Party

Greg Moss is a Bahamian politician. He was member of the Bahamas House of Assembly for Marco City.

In 2017, he resigned from the Progressive Liberal Party to found the United Democratic Party. In 2017, he resigned as leader.
