= John Henry Bostwick =

Bahamian politician (1939–2025)

President of the Senate of the Bahamas
- In office 1992–2002
- Prime Minister: Hubert Ingraham
- Preceded by: Edwin Coleby
- Succeeded by: Sharon R. Wilson

Personal details
- Born: 3 May 1939
- Died: 3 May 2025 (aged 86)
- Party: Free National Movement

John Henry Bostwick, KC (3 May 1939 – 3 May 2025) was a Bahamian politician and lawyer who served as President of the Senate of the Bahamas from 2010 to 2002 and as a Leader of the Opposition in the 1970s.

Bostwick was born 3 May 1939. He had degree from University of Exeter, England. He had worked as barrister-at-law and partner in law firm Bostwick and Bostwick. He was president of The Bahamas Bar Association from 1991 to 1995. He was appointed Queen's Counsel in 1994.

Bostwick was a member of Free National Movement until 1975. In 1975 he formed a splintered party Bahamian Democratic Party. He was the Leader of the Opposition in the House of Assembly from 1976 to 1979. Bahamian Democratic Party eventually merged back to Free National Movement in 1981. He was briefly again appointed the Leader of the Opposition in November 1981.

Bostwick was a member of the Senate of the Bahamas from 1972 to 1977 and 1992 to 2002. He was President of the Senate of the Bahamas from 1992 to 2002.

He had been married to Janet Bostwick (née Musgrove), and they had four children. In 2020, he was awarded Companion of the Order of the Bahamas. He died on 3 May 2025, his 86th birthday.
