= ATI Enterprises =

Career training schools in US

ATI Enterprises, also known as ATI Schools and Colleges and ATI Training Center, was a group of career training schools operating in the southern and western United States. The company imploded in 2013 under a burden of multiple lawsuits, legal claims and financial issues.

They offer programs in health care, information technology, and the skilled trades. They have instructional facilities in Florida, Texas, Oklahoma. New Mexico, and Arizona. Some of the Texas programs are operated under the name of "South Texas Vocational Technical Institute", and some of the Arizona programs under the name of "Arizona Automotive Institute". The combined schools had 7300 students and 17 campuses in March 2012. The schools in the chain are accredited by the Accrediting Commission of Career Schools and Colleges of Technology, and various Texas and Florida agencies

As of 2011, Michael Gries became the interim president and chief executive officer, succeeding Carli Strength. The company's demise began several years earlier while under the direction of Strength.

In August 2011, following complaints of inflated job-placement rates, the Texas Workforce Commission revoked certificates of approval for 22 of the chain's programs, and put all the Texas campuses on probation. On August 30, 2011, the US Department of Justice filed a complaint against the chain for false claims for student loans, based on their enrollment of ineligible students and false statements to students about future employability. With its federal funding cut off, the company began bleeding money and went into a financial tail spin.

The company closed in 2013 due to legal issues.
