= Government High School, Nassau =

High school in Nassau, Bahamas

Coordinates: 25.0483°N 77.3619°W

Government High School is a state secondary school in Nassau, Bahamas. At one time, it was a selective grammar school and one of the country's leading institutions.

== Early years as a selective school ==
Government High School became the Bahamas' first state school when it opened on 27 April 1925, providing for the education of blacks and girls who had been excluded from the colony's private schools. The school was established as a result of concerted public lobbying.

It was a selective state school that became known for educating a generation of middle-class brown and black Bahamians before and immediately after the country achieved universal suffrage in 1961.

Entry was open to students aged 11 to 18 who passed an entrance exam and fees were payable slightly less than the country's parochial schools. Initially intended for teacher training, the school prepared students for Cambridge exams and later the Cambridge Overseas School Certificate.

== Modern comprehensive school ==
The school now exists as one of many public comprehensive secondary schools on the island of New Providence.

== Headmasters and headmistresses ==
- Albert Woods, from 1925
- Dr. A. Deans Peggs, 1942-1958
- Cecil Valentine Bethel, first Bahamian headmaster of GHS, from 1964
- Hugh Gordon Sands, first alumni to become headmaster
- Anatol Rodgers, third Bahamian head and first headmistress, 1971-1975

== Notable alumni ==
- Paul Adderley, former Attorney-General of the Bahamas
- Sir Gerald Cash, former Governor-General of the Bahamas
- Dame Ivy Dumont, former Governor-General of the Bahamas
- Sir Randol Fawkes, trade unionist and Cabinet minister
- Sir Cyril Fountain, lawyer and judge
- Hubert Ingraham, former Prime Minister of the Bahamas
- Sir Kendal Isaacs, former Solicitor-General, Attorney General, and Leader of the Opposition
- Sir Lynden Pindling, first Prime Minister of an independent Bahamas
- Dame Joan Sawyer, former Chief Justice of the Supreme Court of the Bahamas
- Stafford Sands, businessman and Cabinet Minister
- Sir Orville Turnquest, former Governor-General of the Bahamas
- Sir Cecil Wallace Whitfield, Cabinet Minister and Leader of the Opposition
- Frank Watson, former Deputy Prime Minister of the Bahamas
