= Zhivargo Laing =

Bahamian politician (born 1967)

Member of the Parliament of the Bahamas for Marco City
- In office 2007–2012
- Succeeded by: Greg Moss

Personal details
- Born: 7 September 1967 (age 58)
- Party: Free National Movement
- Parent: Naomi Seymour (mother)

Zhivargo Laing (born on September 7, 1967) is a Bahamian economic consultant, former cabinet member and former member of the Bahamas House of Assembly for the Marco City constituency.

== Education ==
As the seventh child of hotel worker Cedric Laing and former Senator Naomi Seymour, he grew up on Grand Bahama. He attended Lewis Yard Primary School and Hawksbill High School before moving to Nassau, where he attended the College of the Bahamas (COB). Later, he was enrolled at the University of Western Ontario, Canada, graduating with a Bachelor of Art's Degree in Agro-economics. Laing went on to pursue graduate courses at George Washington University, concentrating on business administration.

== Career ==
After returning to the Bahamas in 1989, Laing served as an investment analyst in the Bahamas Investments Authority, located under the Office of the Prime Minister. As a public officer, he represented the Bahamas overseas on several occasions and pursued an in-service training award in Japan. He also served as a diplomatic officer at the Embassy of the Bahamas in Washington, D.C., and as a representative of the Bahamas at the Organization of American States (OAS). He previously served as the president of the College of the Bahamas (COB) Union of Students and a youth minister of Calvary Temple Baptist Assembly of God Church on Grand Bahama. He also founded "Youth Who Care", a community-based organization, and later served as its President. In 1993, he was appointed by the government as a member of the Consultative Committee on National Youth Development. He was sworn in as the Minister of State in the Ministry of Youth, Sport and Culture in March 1997 and appointed Minister of State for Education and Youth in January 2000. Laing is the Chairman of the Board of Governors at the Caribbean Development Bank and the Governor of the Inter-American Development Bank.

He is married to Zsa Zsa LaRoda. They have three sons and a daughter. He has written a weekly column called "Straight Up Talk" for The Tribune (Nassau) and hosted "Public Affairs Corner", a talk show, on Mix 105.9 FM. He currently operates a private consulting firm.

== Bibliography ==
He has also published three books:

- College, Career and Money – A Guide for Teens and Young Adults (with David Burrows), Pneuma Life (2004) ISBN 1-56229-204-8
- A Trust Out of this World, Thompson-Shore (2004) ISBN 0-9722625-9-8
- Who Moved My Conch – Understanding Free Trade Agreements, Media ISBN 0-9746191-9-1
