= Bahamian Democratic Party =

Defunct political party of the Bahamas

- Abbreviation: BDP
- Founder: John Henry Bostwick
- Legalised: 1975
- Dissolved: 1981
- Split from: Free National Movement
- Merged into: Free National Movement

The Bahamian Democratic Party was a political party in the Bahamas. It was founded as a split from Free National Movement in 1975 and was led by John Henry Bostwick. The party contested the 1977 general elections, in which it received 27% of the vote and won six seats, becoming the largest opposition party in the House of Assembly. As a result, Bostwick was appointed Leader of the Opposition. The party eventually merged with Free National Movement in 1981.
