= Workers' Party (Bahamas) =

The Workers' Party was a minor political party in the Bahamas. It contested the 1982 elections, in which it received only 31 votes and failed to win a seat.
