= 1982 Bahamian general election =

- 10 June 1982

All 43 seats in the House of Assembly 22 seats needed for a majority
- Registered: 84,235
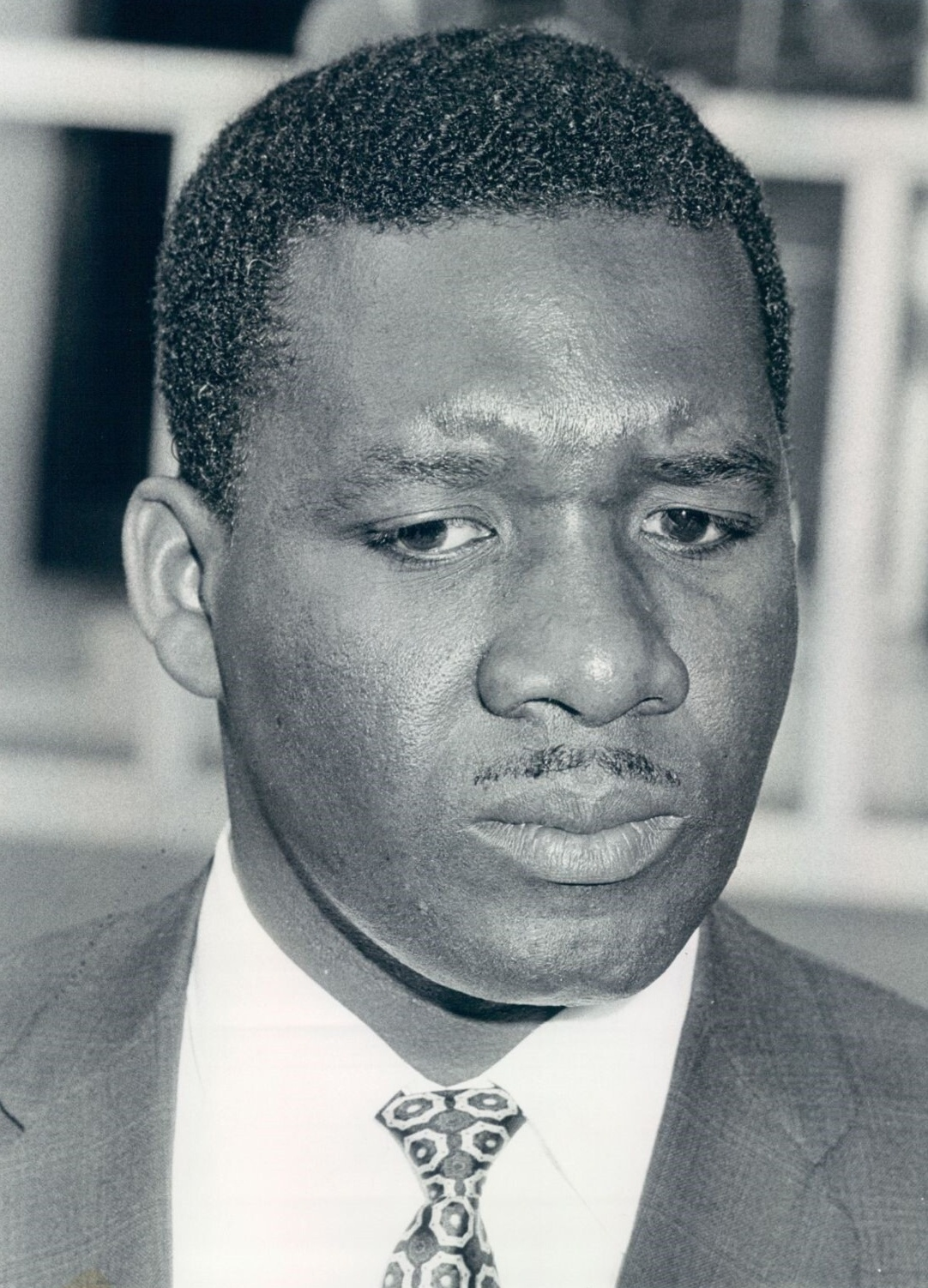

	First party	Second party
Leader	Lynden Pindling	Kendal Isaacs
Party	PLP	FNM
Leader's seat	Andros – Kemps Bay	Delaporte
Last election	54.74%, 30 seats	15.59%, 2 seats
Seats won	32	11
Seat change	▲2	▲9
Popular vote	42,995	31,097
Percentage	56.86%	41.13%
Swing	▲2.12pp	▲25.54pp
Prime Minister before election
Lynden Pindling
PLP
Elected Prime Minister
Lynden Pindling
PLP

General elections were held in the Bahamas on 10 June 1982. The result was a victory for the Progressive Liberal Party, which won 32 of the 43 seats. Janet Bostwick of the Free National Movement (FNM) became the first female member of the House of Assembly. Surprisingly attorney general and minister of external affairs Paul Adderley and former Leader of the Opposition Norman Solomon lost their seats.

The FNM won most of its seats in middle and upper income districts, while the PLP was successful in lower income districts.

== Results ==
Party	Votes	%	Seats	+/–
Progressive Liberal Party	42,995	56.86	32	+2
Free National Movement	31,097	41.13	11	+9
Vanguard Nationalist and Socialist Party	181	0.24	0	0
Workers' Party	31	0.04	0	New
Commonwealth Democratic Party	13	0.02	0	New
Independents	1,292	1.71	0	0
Total	75,609	100.00	43	+5
Registered voters/turnout	84,235	–		
Source: Nohlen
