= Killarney (Bahamas Parliament constituency) =

- Constituency
- District: New Providence

Current constituency
- Created: 2007
- Seats: 1
- Party: Free National Movement
- Member: Hubert Minnis
- Created from: Delaporte; Adelaide; Clifton

Killarney is a parliamentary constituency represented in the House of Assembly of the Bahamas created in 2007. It elects one Member of Parliament (MP) using a First past the post electoral system. The seat has been held by the Free National Movement and has had Hubert Minnis as its MP since its creation.

== Boundaries ==
The constituency covers northwestern New Providence Island, starting at Cable Beach and encompassing the West End and Lake Killarney. It is one of the largest constituencies, which has garnered calls to have its boundaries altered.

== Members of Parliament ==
Election	Candidate	Party	Notes
2007	Hubert Minnis	FNM	
2026	Michaela Barnett Ellis	FNM	

== Electoral history ==
General Election 2021: Killarney
Party	Candidate	Votes	%	±%
FNM	Hubert Minnis	2,501	48.79	▼24.65
PLP	Ronald Duncombe	1,948	38.00	▲18.84
DNA	Kendal Lewis Jr.	323	6.30	▼1.10
COI	Richa Sands	323	6.30	New
Independent	Celi Moss	31	0.06	New
Turnout		5,126	72.08	
Registered electors		7,112		

General Election 2017: Killarney
Party	Candidate	Votes	%	±%
FNM	Hubert Minnis	4,186	73.44	▲20.95
PLP	Reineka Knowles	1,092	19.16	▼16.55
DNA	Arinthia Komolafe	422	7.4	▼3.95
Turnout		5,700		▲
Registered electors				
FNM hold				

General Election 2012: Killarney
Party	Candidate	Votes	%	±%
FNM	Hubert Minnis	2,434	52.49	▼1.3
PLP	Jerome Gomez	1,642	35.71	▼10.5
DNA	Prodesta Moore	522	11.35	New
Turnout		4,598		▲
Registered electors				
FNM hold				

General Election 2007: Killarney
Party	Candidate	Votes	%	±%
FNM	Hubert Minnis	2,065	53.79	
PLP	Neville Wisdom	1,774	46.21	
Turnout		3,839		
Registered electors				
FNM win (new seat)				

== See also ==
- Constituencies of the Bahamas
