= Leader of the Opposition (Bahamas) =

Political position in The Bahamas

Leader of the Opposition is a constitutionally sanctioned office in The Bahamas. The Constitution requires that there is a Leader of the Opposition in the House of Assembly of The Bahamas who is appointed by the Governor-General of The Bahamas. Usually the person comes from the largest group in the House of Assembly that is not in government. The Leader of the Opposition can appoint a Shadow cabinet.

The position of the Leader of the Opposition was established in 1964.

== Leaders of the Opposition ==
Name	Took office	Left office	Party	Notes
Lynden Pindling	1964	January 1967	PLP	
Roland Symonette	January 1967	1970	UBP	
Geoffrey Johnstone	February 1970	July 1971	UBP	
Cecil Wallace-Whitfield	1971	1972	FNM	
Kendal Isaacs	1972	1976	FNM	
Cyril Fountain	1976	?	FNM	
Cyril Tynes	? - January 1977	1977	FNM	
John Henry Bostwick	1977	1979	BDP	
Norman Solomon	1979	1981	SDP	
John Henry Bostwick	1981	1981	FNM	
Kendal Isaacs	1981	1987	FNM	
Cecil Wallace-Whitfield	1987	1990	FNM	
Hubert Ingraham	May 1990	August 1992	FNM	
Lynden Pindling	August 1992	1993	PLP	
Bernard Nottage	1993	April 1997	PLP	
Perry Christie	April 1997	May 2002	PLP	
Alvin Smith	May 2002	November 2005	FNM	
Hubert Ingraham	November 2005	May 2007	FNM	
Perry Christie	May 2007	May 2012	PLP	
Hubert Minnis	May 2012	December 2016	FNM	
Loretta Butler-Turner	December 2016	May 2017	FNM	
Philip Davis	May 2017	September 2021	PLP	
Hubert Minnis	September 2021	November 2021	FNM	
Michael Pintard	November 2021	Incumbent	FNM	

== See also ==
- Politics of The Bahamas
- House of Assembly of The Bahamas
- Prime Minister of The Bahamas
