= Hubert Minnis =

Bahamian physician and politician (born 1954)

The Most Honourable Hubert Minnis ON
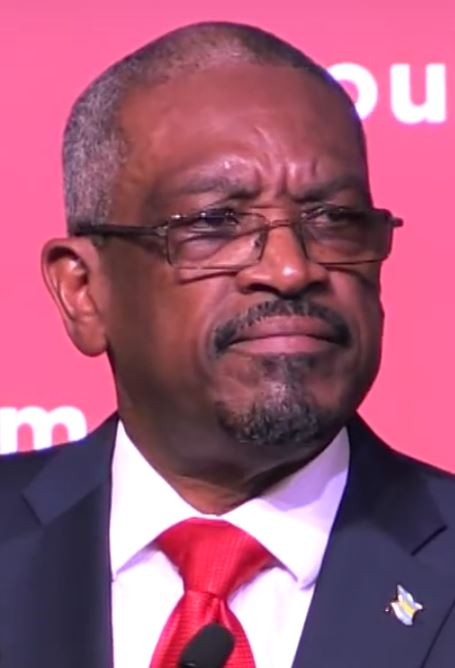

4th Prime Minister of The Bahamas
- In office 11 May 2017 – 17 September 2021
- Monarch: Elizabeth II
- Governor-General: Marguerite Pindling; Cornelius A. Smith
- Deputy: Peter Turnquest; Desmond Bannister
- Preceded by: Perry Christie
- Succeeded by: Philip Davis

Leader of the Opposition
- In office 17 September 2021 – 27 November 2021
- Monarch: Elizabeth II
- Governor-General: Cornelius A. Smith
- Preceded by: Philip Davis
- Succeeded by: Michael Pintard

Member of Parliament for Killarney
- Incumbent
- Assumed office 3 May 2007

Minister of Finance
- In office 30 November 2020 – 16 September 2021
- Preceded by: K. Peter Turnquest
- Succeeded by: Philip Davis

Personal details
- Born: Hubert Alexander Minnis; 16 April 1954 (age 72) Nassau, Bahamas
- Party: Free National Movement
- Spouse: Patricia Beneby
- Children: 3
- Education: University of Minnesota, Twin Cities; University of the West Indies

Hubert Alexander Minnis, ON (born 16 April 1954) is a Bahamian politician and doctor who served as prime minister of The Bahamas from May 2017 to 16 September 2021. Minnis is the former leader of the Free National Movement, the former governing party, and the Member of Parliament for the New Providence constituency of Killarney. First elected to the legislature in the 2007 election, he succeeded the Rt Hon. Hubert Ingraham as party leader following the party's defeat in the 2012 election.

He was dismissed from his leadership role in the FNM in December 2016, and regained the position in April 2017 after much internal conflict within the party. He became prime minister following the victory of his party in the general election held on 10 May 2017.

== Early life, education, and career ==
Minnis was born in Nassau, New Providence to Rosalie North and Randolph Minnis. He was educated at Our Lady's Primary School, Western Junior and St. Augustine College, Nassau and he also attended the University of Minnesota.

After obtaining his doctor of medicine degree from the University of the West Indies and MRCOG from London in 1985, he returned home and began working as a physician at the Princess Margaret Hospital where he served as a consultant and Head of Department of Obstetrics and Gynecology and also as Deputy Chief of Staff.

Minnis was president of the Medical Association of The Bahamas, member of the Medical Council, chairman of the Hotel Corporation of The Bahamas and an associate lecturer at the University of West Indies in Obstetrics and Gynecology. He has a special interest and dedication to the promotion of Bahamian ownership in the economy and for the redevelopment of traditional Over-the-Hill communities.

Minnis was first elected to parliament in May 2007 and was appointed to the cabinet as Minister of Health.

== In opposition the first time ==
=== Leader of the Opposition: 2012–2016 ===
With only nine members in his delegation, Minnis had a rocky road ahead. His leadership was considered weak and there were several challenges to it. In December 2016, after a vote of non-confidence by seven of the ten sitting members of his party; five members went to the Governor General and asked that he be removed from the helm of the FNM; although he remained as the leader of the party, Loretta Butler-Turner became the official leader of the opposition.

=== 2017 general election ===
As the election approached, the membership of the party at large supported Minnis over the dissenters, all of whom lost their nominations. These members ran as independent candidates during the general election and lost. Minnis and the FNM, under the slogan "It's the People's Time!", defeated the rival Progressive Liberal Party (PLP) in the general election held on 10 May 2017, winning 35 seats of 39, and Minnis became prime minister.

== Prime minister ==
Minnis was sworn in as prime minister on 12 May 2017 and presented his cabinet on the 15th. He has held the additional portfolio of Minister of Finance since November 2020.

=== Hurricane Dorian ===
Minnis' greatest challenge was Hurricane Dorian in 2019, which killed at least 70 people and devastated several islands. He was greatly criticized for his government’s poor response to the catastrophe, and dealt with allegations that the Bahamian government siphoned relief donations into personal accounts, and stockpiled aid and donated building materials. The number of 70 dead is highly debated as eyewitness accounts and testimonies from aid workers and civilians alike place the real toll at around 2,000. The number of 70 dead only referred to identified bodies, as settlements like the Mudd and Pigeon Peas were destroyed and most inhabitants were undocumented Haitian immigrants. There are also accounts of mass graves being dug by Bahamian authorities, with reporters ordered to secrecy and their cameras being destroyed.

=== Foreign Affairs ===
His government aligned itself with that of the United States in international relations. On Venezuela, he refused to recognize President Nicolas Maduro and supported Juan Guaido, an opposition leader. He and other pro-US Caribbean leaders attended a summit meeting with Donald Trump in March 2019 to define a common policy on the situation in Venezuela and China's "predatory economic practices".

=== 2021 general election ===
In August 2021, Minnis called a snap election, less than a year before it was due. Although Minnis retained his seat, the FNM lost it in a landslide and he conceded.

== In opposition the second time ==
After losing the election, Minnis said he would retire, but would retain the leadership pending a leadership election, which was scheduled for November 2021.

In February 2026, Minnis announced he would run as an independent candidate for Killarney in the 2026 Bahamian general election.

== Personal life ==
Minnis is married to Sybilene Patricia Beneby and is also the father of three children. His son Jamil Minnis is also a medical doctor.

According to the declared financial declarations, Hubert Minnis is worth US$14.04 million as of 2021.

== Honours ==
=== National honours ===
- Bahamas:
  - Member of the Order of the Nation (ON) (2018)

Political offices
Preceded by Perry Christie	Prime Minister of The Bahamas; 2017–2021	Succeeded by Philip Davis
Preceded by Philip Davis	Leader of the Opposition; 2021	Succeeded by Michael Pintard
