= 2017 Bahamian general election =

- 10 May 2017

All 39 seats in the House of Assembly 20 seats needed for a majority
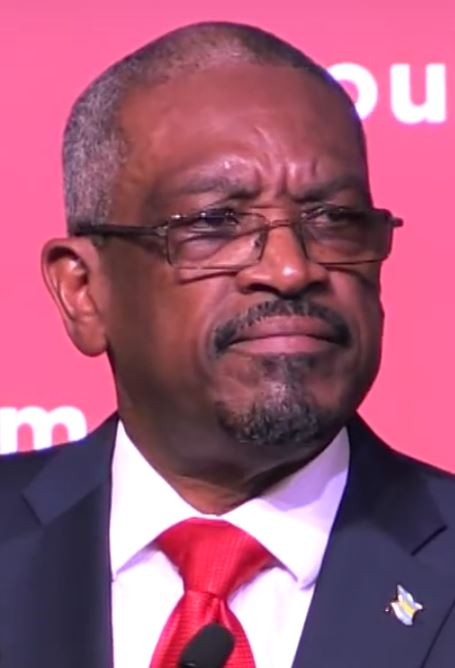

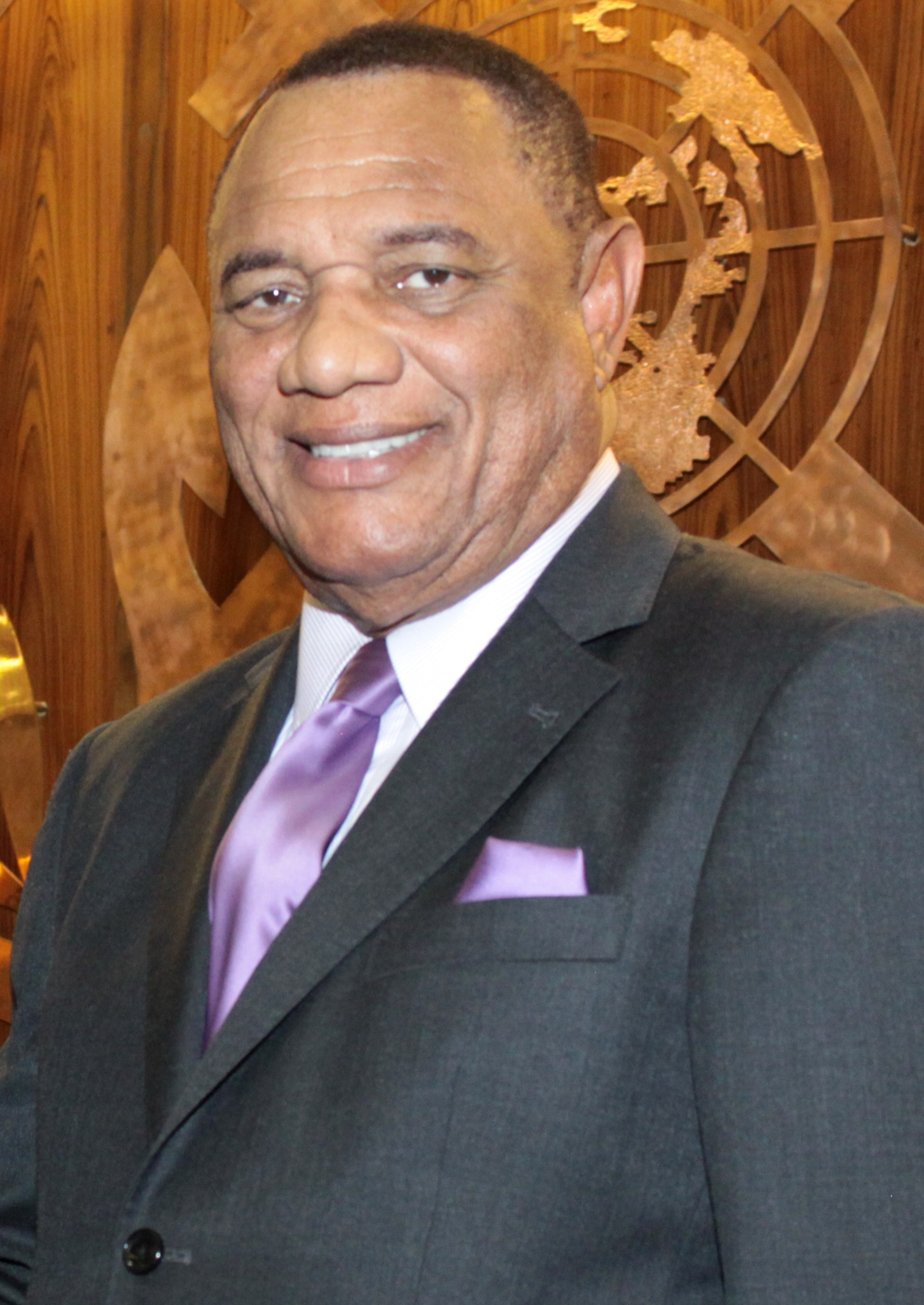
| | First party | Second party |
|---|---|---|
| Leader | Hubert Minnis | Perry Christie |
| Party | FNM | PLP |
| Leader's seat | Killarney | Centreville (defeated) |
| Last election | 42.09%, 9 seats | 48.62%, 29 seats |
| Seats won | 35 | 4 |
| Seat change | ▲26 | ▼25 |
| Popular vote | 91,401 | 59,253 |
| Percentage | 56.99% | 36.94% |
| Swing | ▲14.90pp | ▼11.68pp |
- Winning party by constituency
Prime Minister before election
Perry Christie
PLP
Elected Prime Minister
Hubert Minnis
FNM

General elections were held in the Bahamas on 10 May 2017. The elected members of the House of Assembly then elected the Prime Minister.

The result was a victory for the opposition Free National Movement led by Hubert Minnis, which defeated the ruling Progressive Liberal Party led by Prime Minister Perry Christie.

== Background ==
The Free National Movement (FNM) defeated the Progressive Liberal Party (PLP) in the 2007 general elections during a scandal involving the residency status of model and reality television star Anna Nicole Smith and allegations that the PLP's immigration minister had fast-tracked her application to live in the islands.

The composition of the House of Assembly changed during the 2012–17 term. Former Prime Minister Hubert Ingraham resigned as the leader of the FNM following the party's loss in the 2012 polls and also resigned his parliamentary seat, forcing a by-election in the North Abaco constituency. This resulted in the PLP winning the seat and increasing their total to 30. Subsequently, the PLP lost three seats; Greg Moss left the party to form the United Democratic Party in 2015, while Andre Rollins and Renward Wells defected to the FNM, bringing the PLP's total down to 27 seats.

== Electoral system ==
Members of the House of Assembly are elected from single-member constituencies using first-past-the-post voting. In the 2017 general elections, there were 39 seats up for grabs in the House of Assembly. This was an increase of one seat from the 38 seat total in the previous parliamentary term, which began after the 2012 polls. The majority party then selects the Prime Minister, who is appointed by the Governor-General.

== Parties and leaders ==
- Progressive Liberal Party
  - Perry Christie (Centreville)
- Free National Movement
  - Hubert Minnis (Killarney)
- Democratic National Alliance
  - Branville McCartney
- Bahamas Constitution Party
  - S. Ali McIntosh
- Bahamas National Coalition Party
  - Wesley Campbell
- The People's Movement
  - Patrick Paul

== Campaign ==
Controversy arose quickly in the 2017 election campaign when Prime Minister Christie made the comment "Listen, its goin' so good now, God can't stop me now" at his opening rally on the island of Exuma, which caused a furious backlash.

The opposition parties decried allegations of rampant corruption in the PLP government, while it went after allegations of the same thing in the previous government, run by the FNM.

Many lamented the descent of the campaign into "gutter politics."

Infighting in the FNM also caused some controversy. The leader of the FNM, Hubert Minnis, was replaced as the leader of the Official Opposition in the nation's House of Assembly by Loretta Butler-Turner. Butler-Turner served, at one time, as the deputy leader of the FNM party, while Minnis served as party leader. Feuding within the FNM led to a "coup" in late 2016 among FNM parliamentarians in the House of Assembly. As a result, Minnis was removed as the leader of the Official Opposition in the House of Assembly, while remaining as the leader of the FNM party. As the general elections loomed, the FNM revoked Butler-Turner's nomination as the FNM's candidate for the Long Island constituency. Butler-Turner then opted to run as an independent candidate for the Long Island constituency, while remaining as the leader of the Official Opposition in the House of Assembly until its dissolution in April 2017.

== Results ==
| Party | Votes | % | Seats | +/– |
|---|---|---|---|---|
| Free National Movement | 91,409 | 56.99 | 35 | +26 |
| Progressive Liberal Party | 59,253 | 36.94 | 4 | –25 |
| Democratic National Alliance | 7,577 | 4.72 | 0 | 0 |
| Bahamas Constitution Party | 315 | 0.20 | 0 | 0 |
| Bahamas National Coalition Party | 314 | 0.20 | 0 | New |
| The People's Movement | 200 | 0.12 | 0 | New |
| Independents | 1,339 | 0.83 | 0 | 0 |
| Total | 160,407 | 100.00 | 39 | +1 |
| Registered voters/turnout | 181,543 | – | | |
Source: PRD, PRD
