= Desmond Bannister =

Bahamian politician

Thomas Desmond Bannister

Former Deputy Prime Minister of the Bahamas Minister of State for Legal Affairs 2007 Minister of Youth, Sports and Culture 2009 Minister of Education: 2010 Minister of Public Works: 2017
- In office 25 November 2020 – 17 September 2021
- Preceded by: K. Peter Turnquest
- Succeeded by: Chester Cooper
- Prime Minister: Hubert Minnis

Personal details
- Born: Thomas Desmond Bannister
- Party: Free National Movement

Thomas Desmond Bannister is a Bahamian Attorney -At-Law and politician who served as Deputy Prime Minister of the Commonwealth of the Bahamas. He is a member of the Free National Movement, and has also served in Parliament as:

- Minister of State for Legal Affairs: 2007 to 2009
- Minister of Youth, Sports and Culture: 2009 to 2010
- Minister of Education: 2010 to 2012
- Minister of Public Works: 2017 to 2021

Bannister was born in Staniard Creek, Andros, Bahamas. He received his tertiary education at:

- Miami Dade Community College, Florida
- Grinnell College, Iowa
- The University of the West Indies Law Faculty, Barbados; and
- The Norman Manley Law School, Jamaica.
- He worked as an Attorney.

Bannister was twice elected as a member of the Bahamian House of Assembly for the Carmichael Constituency, in 2007 and again in 2017. He has also served on two occasions in the Bahamian Senate.

== Youth and early career ==
Bannister was born in Staniard Creek, Andros in the Bahamas. He is the son of Horatio David Bannister and Joyce Clarke-Bannister. He grew up in the islands of Andros, Bimini and New Providence, and attended Staniard Creek Andros All Age School, and Sayles Primary School, the Government High School and St. Johns College in New Providence.

Bannister read law and received his LL.b degree at The University of the West Indies Law Faculty, Barbados. He obtained his Certificate of Legal Education at The Norman Manley Law School, Jamaica. Bannister was called to the Bars of the Commonwealth of the Bahamas and Barbados.
