= Kendal Isaacs =

Bahamian lawyer and politician

Sir Kendal George Lamon Isaacs, KCMG, CBE, QC (23 July 1925 – 25 May 1996) was a notable Bahamian lawyer and politician. He served as Leader of the Opposition for much of the 1980s.

== Early life and education ==
Born and raised in Nassau, Isaacs attended Government High School in Nassau where he was captain of Montague House.

Isaacs served in the North Caribbean Force during World War II and then went to England to study law. He received a Bachelor of Arts and Bachelor of Laws from Queens' College, Cambridge, in 1949 and a Master of Arts in 1953.

== Legal career ==
Isaacs was admitted to the Bar of England and Wales at the Middle Temple in 1946.

In 1961, Isaacs was appointed Solicitor-General of the Bahamas; a post in which he served until 1963 when he became the country's Attorney-General (1963-1965).

Isaacs took silk when he was made Queen's Counsel on 21 August 1968.

== Political career ==
Isaacs's first foray into politics came in 1965 when he was appointed to the Senate of the Bahamas. In June 1972, Isaacs was elected to the House of Assembly of the Bahamas for the Free National Movement party.

Isaacs served as leader of the opposition from 1971 to 1976 and again from 1981 to 1987.

His agitation resulted in the 1984 Royal Commission of Inquiry into Drug Trafficking and Government Corruption but did not result in the ouster of the Pindling-led PLP government until 1992.

== Personal life ==
Isaacs was an accomplished tennis player. In 1955, he and his nephew, Robert, were the third ranked men's doubles team in the American Tennis Association rankings. He was instrumental in the formation of the Bahamas Lawn Tennis Association in 1961 and served as its first president until 1966.

He was also the brother-in-law of suffragist and politician, Dame Bertha Isaacs.

== Honours and legacy ==
Appointed a Commander of the British Empire in June 1970 while Vice-President of the Senate, Isaacs was appointed a Knight Commander of Order of St Michael and St George in the Queen's 1993 New Year's Honours List.

In 1990, the Kendal G L Isaacs Gymnasium was opened at the Queen Elizabeth Sports Centre and named in his honour.
