= Free National Movement =

- Abbreviation: FNM
- Leader: Michael Pintard
- Chairman: Duane Sands
- Founded: 20 October 1971; 54 years ago
- Split from: Progressive Liberal Party
- Headquarters: Mackey Street, N. 144; P.O. Box N-10713, Nassau
- Youth wing: Torch Bearers
- Ideology: Conservatism
- Political position: Centre-right
- Colours: Red
- Slogan: "We Work for You, Not the Few"
- House of Assembly: 8 / 41
- Senate: 4 / 16

Website
- www.fnmbahamas.org

The Free National Movement (FNM) is a Bahamian conservative and centre-right political party and one of the two principal parties in the country's two-party system. It emerged in the early 1970s from dissidents within the governing Progressive Liberal Party and elements of the former United Bahamian Party, and was initially led by Cecil Wallace-Whitfield. It became the principal alternative to the PLP in the years surrounding Bahamian independence.

The party first won power in the 1992 general election under Hubert Ingraham, ending the PLP's 25 years in government, and was re-elected in 1997. It returned to office in the 2007 general election and again won a landslide in the 2017 general election under Hubert Minnis, before suffering heavy defeats in the 2021 and 2026 general elections. The FNM has generally been associated with free enterprise, government accountability, and administrative reform. Its current leader is Michael Pintard, who continued as Leader of the Opposition after the 2026 election.

== Ideology and political position ==
The Free National Movement is generally described as a conservative or centre-right party. It emerged in the early 1970s from a merger between the Free PLP, a dissident group from the governing Progressive Liberal Party, and elements of the former United Bahamian Party, which gave it an early identity as a more conservative alternative to the PLP.

In its first victory in 1992, the FNM campaigned as a centre-right party that stressed change, greater economic stringency, and government accountability, while both major parties advocated broadly free-market responses to recession and unemployment. Under Hubert Ingraham, the party also made anti-corruption, honesty, and administrative efficiency central themes of its appeal against the long-ruling PLP.

Even so, the ideological distance between the FNM and the PLP has not always been sharp in practice. Bahamian politics has traditionally been dominated by the centre-left PLP and the centre-right FNM, but party competition in the Commonwealth Caribbean has often been marked by limited ideological distinction, intense competition for access to state resources, and personal or partisan clientelism. In that context, the FNM has often been distinguished less by a distinct economic doctrine than by its claims to cleaner government and tighter administration. Under Michael Pintard, the party has continued to emphasise accountability and administrative reform while placing greater emphasis on cost-of-living pressures, crime, and immigration.

== History ==
Before the FNM emerged, Bahamian party politics had been shaped by rivalry between the Progressive Liberal Party (PLP) and the United Bahamian Party (UBP). The PLP was formed in 1953 by Bahamians of African descent, while the UBP was established in 1958 and was controlled by British-descended politicians. The PLP came to power in 1967 under the banner of majority rule, while the UBP's decline created space for a new opposition alignment in the early 1970s.

=== Formation under Wallace-Whitfield (1970–1972) ===
The Free National Movement emerged from an early split within the governing Progressive Liberal Party. In 1970, eight politicians walked away from the PLP and became known as the "Dissident Eight": Cecil Wallace-Whitfield, Maurice Moore, Arthur Foulkes, Warren J. Levarity, James Shepherd, Curtis McMillan, George Thompson, and Elwood Donaldson. Wallace-Whitfield resigned from cabinet and the PLP at the party's national convention after accusing Lynden Pindling of increasingly dictatorial leadership and intolerance of internal dissent. The dissidents reorganised themselves as the Free Progressive Liberal Party (Free PLP).

On 18 November 1970, the dissidents joined the seven United Bahamian Party MPs in supporting a no-confidence motion against Pindling. The motion failed by 19 votes to 15, but it formalised the rupture within the PLP and helped create the conditions for a broader opposition realignment.

Sources differ on the FNM's precise founding date. The Commonwealth observer report describes it as having been formed in 1971, whereas Encyclopædia Britannica dates its establishment to 1972. In practice, the party took shape over 1971–1972 as the Free PLP, remnants of the UBP, and the small National Democratic Party (NDP) coalesced into a single opposition force before the 1972 general election. The new coalition was fragile from the outset, uniting former PLP dissidents with former UBP elements whose priorities did not always align.

=== Wallace-Whitfield and Isaacs (1972–1990) ===
In the 1972 general election, the newly unified FNM won 10 seats to the PLP's 28 and became the official opposition. In vote terms, the party took 39.3 per cent against 59.0 per cent for the PLP.

The party's early gains proved difficult to sustain. The independence issue split the already weak opposition, and several long-standing UBP members who opposed independence resigned from the FNM after the PLP decided to table the issue in 1972. The party was weakened further after independence in 1973, and in 1976 five FNM members of the House of Assembly broke away to form the Bahamian Democratic Party.

The consequences were severe in the 1977 general election, the first held after independence. The Inter-Parliamentary Union described the contest as one in which the PLP "soundly defeated the divided opposition". The PLP won 30 of the 38 seats, while the BDP took six and the FNM won two seats. In vote share, the FNM fell to 15.6 per cent, far behind both the PLP and the BDP.

By 1979, however, the major opposition parties had merged once more into a reconstituted FNM. Under the leadership of Kendal Isaacs, the party recovered much of its electoral strength. In the 1982 general election, fought amid concerns over unemployment, crime, and allegations of corruption, the FNM won 11 of 43 seats and 42.35 per cent of the vote, its best performance since the party's formation. Although the PLP retained power, the result confirmed that the FNM had re-established itself as the principal opposition force.

By the mid-1980s, allegations that drug trafficking had corrupted public life had become a major issue in Bahamian politics. In the 1987 general election, campaign issues centred on alleged government corruption linked to drug trafficking, as well as unemployment and rising drug use. The FNM, still led by Isaacs, increased its representation to 16 of 49 seats and won 43,244 votes, while the PLP's majority was reduced to 31 seats. The party alleged irregularities in a number of close races, but the election nonetheless showed that the FNM had become a durable challenger to the PLP rather than a temporary anti-government coalition.

After the 1987 election, Isaacs resigned as party leader and Cecil Wallace-Whitfield returned to the leadership. Wallace-Whitfield died in May 1990, closing the party's formative opposition era.

=== Ingraham's leadership (1990–2002) ===
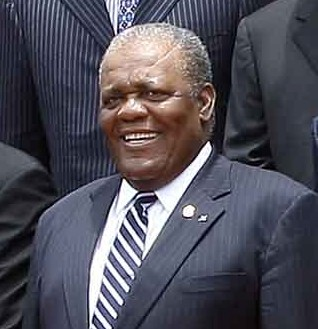
Hubert Ingraham in 2009

After Wallace-Whitfield's death, Hubert Ingraham, a former Progressive Liberal Party cabinet minister who had broken with Lynden Pindling over corruption and joined the FNM in 1990, was elected party leader and became Leader of the Opposition.

Under Ingraham, the party sharpened its appeal as an alternative to the long-ruling PLP. In the 1992 general election, the FNM campaigned on change, economic discipline, and government accountability, while both major parties endorsed broadly free-market responses to recession and unemployment. The election ended Pindling's 25 years in office: the FNM won 55.01 per cent of the vote and a parliamentary majority, and Ingraham was sworn in as prime minister on 21 August 1992.

The party's first period in government was closely tied to Ingraham's political agenda. He pledged to rid the government of corruption, conduct a more open administration, and pursue economic renewal through liberalised policies designed to encourage foreign investment, expand tourism, and privatise a number of state-linked industries. After taking office, he appointed a Commission of Inquiry into the previous PLP administration, which in 1995 described widespread mismanagement and malpractice in the national telephone and airline companies.

The FNM was returned to office with an even larger majority in the 1997 general election. During that campaign, the party defended its first term by arguing that it had opened markets, improved infrastructure, revitalised tourism, and created 14,000 jobs, while the PLP called for a greater state role in the economy. The FNM won 57.7 per cent of the vote and 34 of the 40 seats, leaving the PLP with only six seats. After the election, Ingraham said his second administration would prioritise fighting poverty, poor housing, and crime, while continuing policies of accountability and prudent management.

In the 2002 general election, the PLP won 50.8 per cent of the vote and 29 of the 40 seats, while the FNM fell to 41.1 per cent and seven seats. The result ended the FNM's first decade in power. The IPU noted that although the party was credited with improving the country's international reputation and promoting economic development by attracting foreign developers and hoteliers, it was also criticised for offering too many concessions to foreign investment.

=== Turnquest and Ingraham (2002–2012) ===
The FNM's defeat in 2002 left the party badly weakened after a decade in office. Tommy Turnquest, who had succeeded Ingraham as party leader before the election, also lost his seat, along with a number of cabinet ministers from the outgoing FNM government.

In 2005, Ingraham was re-elected party leader, again became Leader of the Opposition, and led the FNM into the 2007 election cycle.

By the time of the 2007 general election, the party had regrouped under Ingraham's leadership. The campaign again became a straight contest between the FNM and the PLP, centred on the economy, foreign investment, and immigration policy. The FNM argued that the Christie government had been overly accommodating to foreign investors and insisted that Bahamian land should be leased rather than sold, while both major parties also pledged to address illegal immigration. The election was dominated by economic issues and political scandals, including the controversy over Anna Nicole Smith's residency application.

The FNM won the 2007 election with 23 of 41 seats, defeating the PLP's 18 seats. The party's return to office, however, did not restore the conditions of the 1990s. During Ingraham's third premiership, the Bahamian economy was hit by the global economic crisis, which affected tourism and intensified pressure on employment and public finances. At the same time, the government faced mounting public concern over crime. Freedom House reported that nearly all major categories of crime rose sharply in 2011, prompting the administration to amend criminal justice legislation and introduce new public-safety measures.

By 2012, the FNM was defending a government burdened by economic frustration and rising insecurity. The 2012 general election was a close race focused on the economy, crime, and oil, while opposition critics argued that the government had not done enough to stimulate a sluggish recovery from the global financial crisis. The PLP won a resounding victory, taking 29 of the 38 seats, while the FNM fell to nine seats. Ingraham, though re-elected to his own seat, announced his retirement from front-line politics after the result, bringing to an end both his third premiership and the FNM's brief return to government.

=== Minnis' leadership (2012–2021) ===
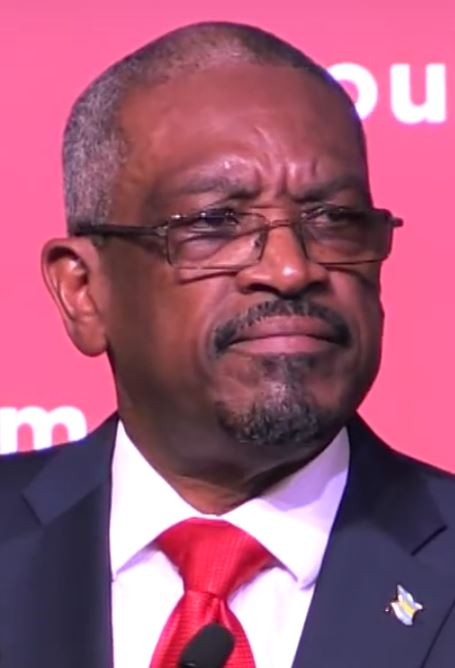
Hubert Minnis in 2016

After the 2012 defeat, Hubert Minnis succeeded Ingraham as party leader and Leader of the Opposition. His leadership was repeatedly challenged, and the party entered the 2017 election cycle after a period of internal turmoil. In late 2016, seven opposition MPs informed the Governor-General that they no longer had confidence in Minnis as parliamentary opposition leader, and Loretta Butler-Turner was sworn in to replace him, although Minnis remained party leader. The party council later rescinded Butler-Turner's ratification as the FNM candidate for Long Island, underlining the depth of the split on the eve of the general election.

The FNM nonetheless returned to power in a landslide at the 2017 general election under Minnis. The party won 35 of the 39 seats in the House of Assembly, while the Progressive Liberal Party was reduced to four seats. The FNM campaigned on a platform of change and "Bahamian ownership in the economy", while the PLP's campaign was overshadowed by corruption scandals and controversy over the delayed opening of the Baha Mar resort.

The scale of the victory gave the FNM a stronger parliamentary position than at any point in its history, but the Minnis administration quickly encountered controversy. In 2018, the proposed Oban Energies oil-storage project in Grand Bahama became a major embarrassment for the government after questions were raised about the company's principals and the due diligence behind the deal. Minnis acknowledged in Parliament that his administration had made "a number of missteps" and said more comprehensive due diligence should have been undertaken.

The government then faced two overlapping national crises. In September 2019, Hurricane Dorian, one of the most powerful Atlantic hurricanes on record, devastated parts of the northern Bahamas and destroyed or severely damaged as many as 13,000 homes. The following year, the COVID-19 pandemic brought a severe economic shock to the tourism-dependent country and put the government under sustained pressure over both public-health restrictions and the state of the economy.

At the same time, longstanding FNM themes of accountability and clean government came under renewed scrutiny. Freedom House reported that legislation to establish an independent anticorruption body and an ombudsman remained stalled in 2020, that procurement processes lacked transparency, and that the 2017 Freedom of Information Act and its whistleblower protections had still not been fully implemented. These shortcomings weakened one of the central claims on which the FNM had built its appeal since the Ingraham era.

Minnis called an early general election for September 2021, although it was not constitutionally due until May 2022. The election was held amid the COVID-19 pandemic, and the PLP gained momentum by focusing on what it described as the government's mishandling of the outbreak and the economy, with unemployment estimated at 20 per cent and the fiscal deficit having widened during the crisis. The result was a dramatic reversal of the 2017 landslide: the PLP won 32 of the 39 seats, while the FNM was reduced to seven seats and returned to opposition. The leader of the Progressive Liberal Party (PLP) Phillip Davis was sworn in as the new prime minister

=== Pintard's leadership (2021–present) ===
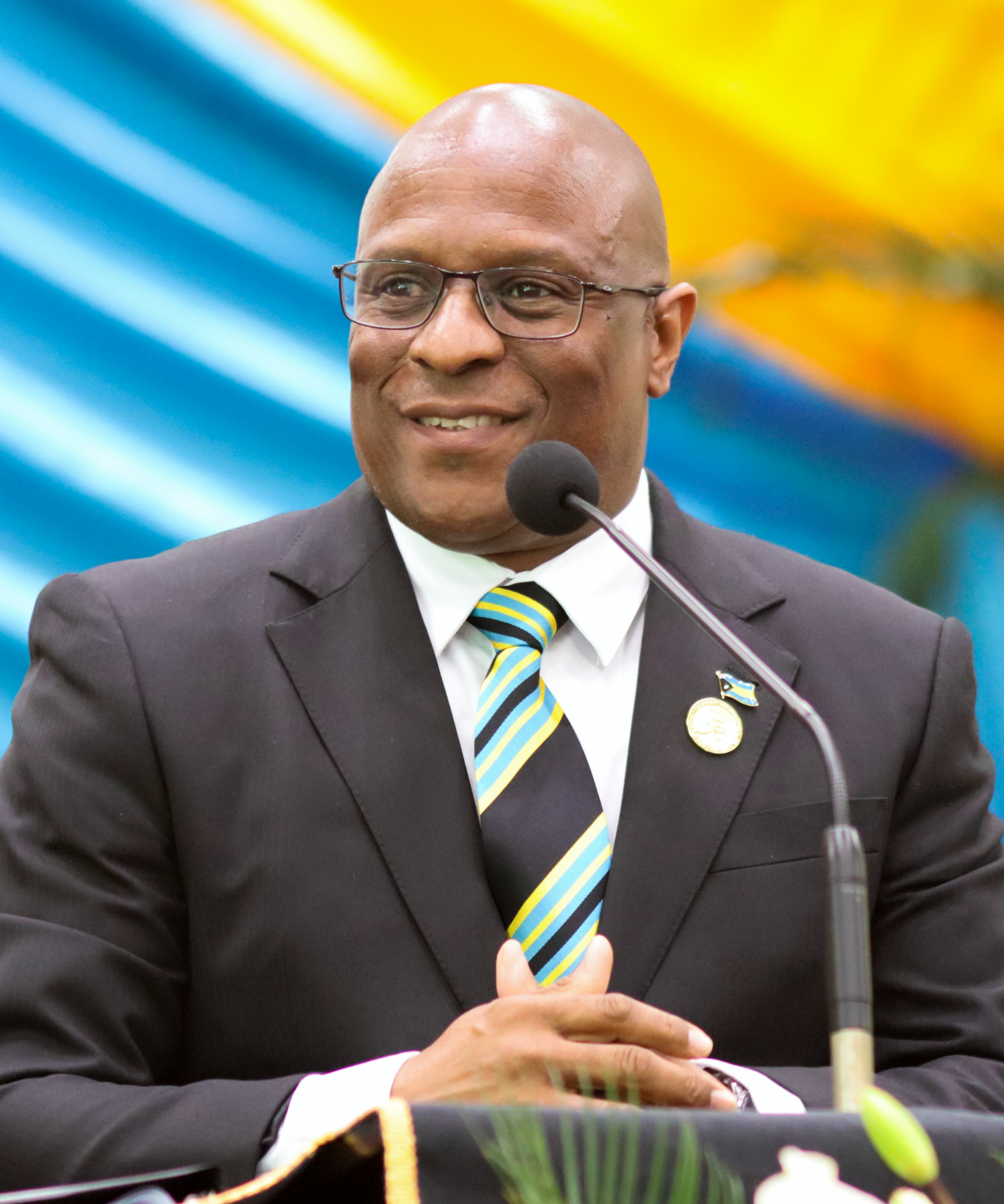
Michael Pintard in 2023

After the FNM's crushing defeat in the 2021 general election, Michael Pintard was elected party leader at the party's one-day convention in November 2021. He defeated Kwasi Thompson and Iram Lewis.

Pintard's first years as leader were shaped by organisational rebuilding and persistent internal tensions. In June 2024, he defeated a leadership challenge from former prime minister Hubert Minnis, strengthening his formal position while also underscoring that the party had not fully moved beyond the divisions left by the 2021 defeat. The party did not immediately regain electoral momentum, losing by-elections in West Grand Bahama and Bimini in 2023 and Golden Isles in 2025. Its internal divisions became more visible in 2025, when Central Grand Bahama MP Iram Lewis left the party for the Coalition of Independents, citing a breakdown of trust and concern about the FNM's direction under Pintard's leadership.

By early 2026, unresolved tensions were compounded by a public break with Minnis, who announced that he would contest Killarney as an independent rather than under the FNM banner. During the campaign, the FNM released a manifesto titled We Work For You and campaigned on tax relief, transparency, healthcare, housing, immigration and sovereignty. The 2026 Bahamian general election produced only a marginal recovery for the FNM. The party won eight of the 41 seats in the enlarged House of Assembly and remained in opposition, while the governing PLP won a second consecutive term. Minnis also failed in his independent bid to return for Killarney. The result triggered renewed debate over the party's leadership. Pintard conceded the election after calling Prime Minister Philip Davis to congratulate him, but did not immediately commit to remaining party leader, saying that he would discuss the matter with his team in the following days. Former deputy prime minister Desmond Bannister called on Pintard to resign, arguing that resignation was the traditional response when a party leader lost a national election. Pintard was sworn in again as Leader of His Majesty's Loyal Opposition on 18 May 2026. The party also faced scrutiny over its Senate appointments after the election. Former NBA player and defeated FNM candidate Rick Fox was appointed to one of the four opposition Senate seats. The decision not to appoint Cartwright to the Senate drew criticism from former cabinet minister Leslie Miller, who accused Pintard of acting spitefully after Cartwright's defeat in St James.

== Election results ==
Election	Party leader	Votes	%	Seats	+/–	Position	Government
1972	Cecil Wallace-Whitfield	19,736	39.3	10 / 38	▲10	2nd	Opposition
1977	Cecil Wallace-Whitfield	9,995	15.6	2 / 38	▼8	▼3rd	Third party
1982	Kendal Isaacs	31,097	42.35	11 / 43	▲11	▲2nd	Opposition
1987	Kendal Isaacs	43,244	47.9	16 / 49	▲5	2nd	Opposition
1992	Hubert Ingraham	61,799	55.01	33 / 49	▲17	▲1st	Supermajority government
1997	Hubert Ingraham	68,766	57.7	34 / 40	▲1	1st	Supermajority government
2002	Tommy Turnquest	52,807	40.9	7 / 40	▼27	▼2nd	Opposition
2007	Hubert Ingraham	68,542	49.9	23 / 41	▲16	▲1st	Majority government
2012	Hubert Ingraham	65,633	42.09	9 / 38	▼14	▼2nd	Opposition
2017	Hubert Minnis	91,137	57.0	35 / 39	▲26	▲1st	Supermajority government
2021	Hubert Minnis	45,730	36.17	7 / 39	▼28	▼2nd	Opposition
2026	Michael Pintard	49,538	35.28	8 / 41	▲1	2nd	Opposition
