= 14th Bahamian Parliament =

Parliament of the Bahamas

| ← | 13th | 15th | → |
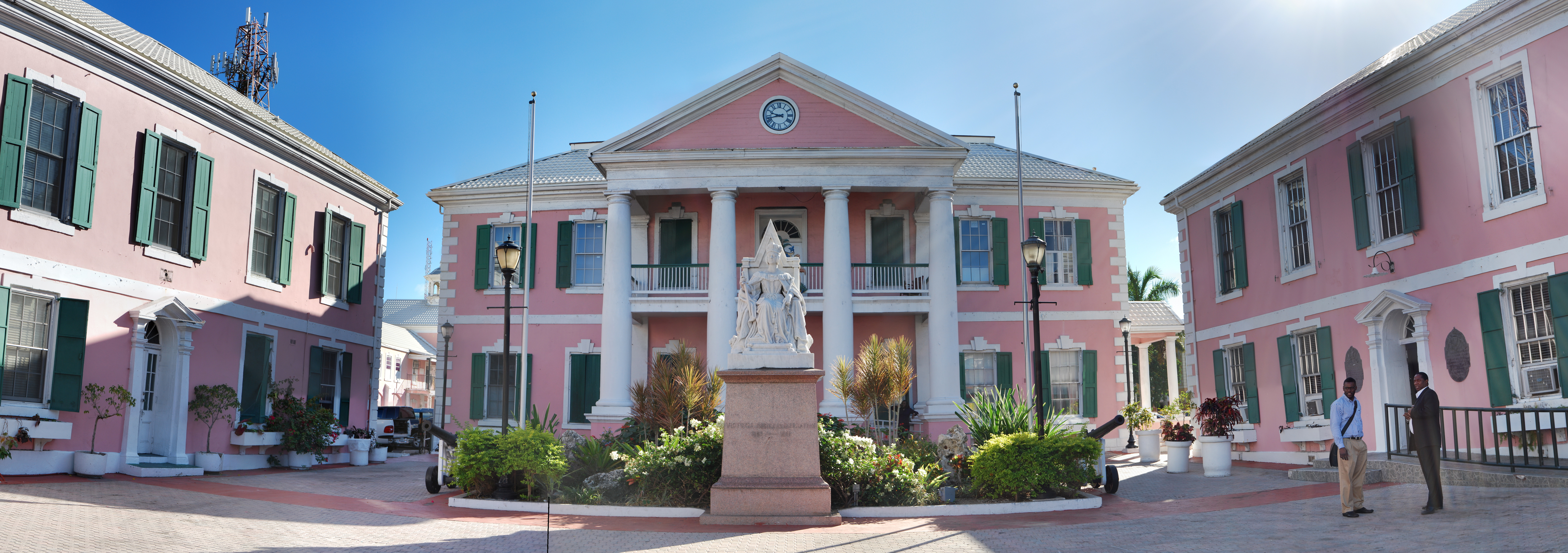

Overview
- Jurisdiction: The Bahamas
- Meeting place: Bahamian Parliament Building
- Term: 6 October 2021 – 8 April 2026
- Election: 2021 general election

House of Assembly
- Members: 39
- Speaker: Patricia Deveaux
- Prime Minister: Philip "Brave" Davis
- Leader of the Opposition: Hubert Minnis (Sept.-Nov. 2021); Michael Pintard (since Nov. 2021)

Senate
- Members: 16
- President: Lashell Adderley

Crown-in-Parliament Elizabeth II (2021-2022) Charles III (since 2022) (represented by Cornelius A. Smith until 2023, then by Cynthia A. Pratt)

Sessions
- 1st: 6 October 2021 – 13 August 2023
- 2nd: 4 October 2023 – 27 March 2026

The 14th Bahamian Parliament was the Parliament of The Bahamas sitting between 2021 and 2026. It was elected in the 2021 Bahamian general election. There are 39 members of the house.

== Members ==
=== MPs ===
| Party | Name | Constituency | Ref. |
|---|---|---|---|
| Progressive Liberal Party (32) | Wayde Watson | Bain Town and Grants Town | |
| Progressive Liberal Party (32) | Patricia Deveaux | Bamboo Town | |
| Progressive Liberal Party (32) | Keith Bell | Carmichael | |
| Progressive Liberal Party (32) | Philip "Brave" Davis | Cat Island, Rum Cay & San Salvador | |
| Progressive Liberal Party (32) | John Pinder II | Central and South Abaco | |
| Progressive Liberal Party (32) | Clay Sweeting | Central and South Eleuthera | |
| Progressive Liberal Party (32) | Jomo Campbell | Centreville | |
| Progressive Liberal Party (32) | JoBeth Coleby-Davis | Elizabeth | |
| Progressive Liberal Party (32) | Glenys Hanna Martin | Englerston | |
| Progressive Liberal Party (32) | Chester Cooper | The Exumas and Ragged Island | |
| Progressive Liberal Party (32) | Alfred Sears | Fort Charlotte | |
| Progressive Liberal Party (32) | Fred Mitchell | Fox Hill | |
| Progressive Liberal Party (32) | Wayne Munroe | Freetown | |
| Progressive Liberal Party (32) | Mario Bowleg | Garden Hills | |
| Progressive Liberal Party (32) | Pia Glover-Rolle | Golden Gates | |
| Progressive Liberal Party (32) | Vaughn Miller | Golden Isles | |
| Progressive Liberal Party (32) | Leon Lundy | Mangrove Cay and South Andros | |
| Progressive Liberal Party (32) | Lisa Rahming | Marathon | |
| Progressive Liberal Party (32) | Basil McIntosh | MICAL | |
| Progressive Liberal Party (32) | Mckell Bonaby | Mount Moriah | |
| Progressive Liberal Party (32) | Jamahl Strachan | Nassau Village | |
| Progressive Liberal Party (32) | Kirk Cornish | North Abaco | |
| Progressive Liberal Party (32) | Leonardo Lightbourne | North Andros and Berry Islands | |
| Progressive Liberal Party (32) | Sylvannus Petty | North Eleuthera | |
| Progressive Liberal Party (32) | Ginger Moxey | Pineridge | |
| Progressive Liberal Party (32) | Myles Laroda | Pinewood | |
| Progressive Liberal Party (32) | Leslia Miller-Brice | Sea Breeze | |
| Progressive Liberal Party (32) | Bacchus Rolle | South Beach | |
| Progressive Liberal Party (32) | Leroy Major | Southern Shores | |
| Progressive Liberal Party (32) | Michael Darville | Tall Pines | |
| Progressive Liberal Party (32) | Kingsley Smith | West Grand Bahama & Bimini | |
| Progressive Liberal Party (32) | Zane Lightbourne | Yamacraw | |
| Free National Movement (6) | | | |
| Free National Movement (6) | Kwasi Thompson | East Grand Bahama | |
| Free National Movement (6) | Hubert Minnis | Killarney | |
| Free National Movement (6) | Adrian Gibson | Long Island | |
| Free National Movement (6) | Michael Pintard | Marco City | |
| Free National Movement (6) | Adrian White | St. Anne's | |
| Free National Movement (6) | Shanendon Cartwright | St. Barnabas | |
| Coalition of Independents (1) | Iram Lewis | Central Grand Bahama | |

=== Senators ===
Senators
| Party | Name | Ref. |
|---|---|---|
| Progressive Liberal Party (12) | Barry Griffin | |
| Progressive Liberal Party (12) | Darron Pickstock | |
| Progressive Liberal Party (12) | Dr. Erecia Hepburn | |
| Progressive Liberal Party (12) | Lashell Adderley | |
| Progressive Liberal Party (12) | James Turner-Rolle | |
| Progressive Liberal Party (12) | Kirkland Russell | |
| Progressive Liberal Party (12) | Ja'Ann Major | |
| Progressive Liberal Party (12) | Randy Rolle | |
| Progressive Liberal Party (12) | Ronald Duncombe | |
| Progressive Liberal Party (12) | Tyrel Young | |
| Progressive Liberal Party (12) | Michael Halkitis | |
| Progressive Liberal Party (12) | Ryan Pinder | |
| Free National Movement (4) | Darren Henfield | |
| Free National Movement (4) | Maxine Seymour | |
| Free National Movement (4) | Reuben Rahming | |
| Free National Movement (4) | Michaela Barnett-Ellis | |

== By-Elections ==
- West Grand Bahama and Bimini on November 23, 2023, triggered by the death of Obie Wilchcombe MP (PLP) and was won by PLP candidate Kingsley Smith.
- Golden Isles on November 24, 2025, triggered by the death of Vaughn Miller MP (PLP) and was won by PLP candidate Darron Pickstock, who resigned from the Senate for the contest.
