= Bahamas Ministry of Youth, Sports and Culture =

Ministry of Youth, Sports and Culture
- Flag of The Bahamas

- Coat of arms of The Bahamas

Ministry overview
- Formed: July 1977
- Jurisdiction: Government of the Bahamas
- Headquarters: Thompson Boulevard, Oakes Field, Nassau, New Providence
- Minister responsible: Mario Bowleg

The Ministry of Youth, Sports and Culture (MOYSC) is a ministry of the Government of the Bahamas responsible for national policy on youth development, sport and cultural affairs. It was created in July 1977 as part of a government initiative to give dedicated attention to the situation of young people and to the development of sports and culture in the archipelago.

The ministry oversees government programmes in youth work, community-based and elite sport, and the arts and cultural heritage, including national festivals such as Junkanoo. Its portfolio includes support for youth organisations, administration of sports facilities and financial aid to athletes and clubs, and the promotion of Bahamian arts and creative industries. As of 2025 the minister is Mario Bowleg, who has held the position since September 2021 in the cabinet of Prime Minister Philip "Brave" Davis.

== History ==
Before 1977, responsibilities for youth affairs, sports and culture were spread across other departments. In July 1977, the Government of the Bahamas formally created the Ministry of Youth, Sports and Culture as part of a broader policy to address youth development and to use sport and culture as tools of nation-building. The first minister responsible was Kendal Nottage, appointed as Minister of Youth, Sports and Community Affairs in the Lynden Pindling administration. Nottage headed the ministry until October 1984 and during his tenure helped to establish a number of key sports initiatives. He resigned in the context of a wider drug-trafficking scandal that embroiled senior officials in the Pindling government.

Livingston N. Coakley, a veteran PLP politician and former Minister of Education and Culture, succeeded Nottage as minister responsible for youth, sports and community affairs in 1984. Peter John Bethel, a doctor and former national-team baseball player, served as Minister of Youth, Sports and Community Affairs from 1987 to 1990. He founded the Bahamas Games and Bahamas' National Hall of Fame. Dr. Norman R. Gay, a physician and long-time MP for Bain Town, served as Minister of Health from 1984 before taking over the youth, sports and culture portfolio in 1990 in Pindling's final term. As minister he guided the Boxing Act through Parliament, creating the Bahamas Boxing Commission, which he later chaired. Later he worked as president of the Bahamas Olympic Association.

During the first Perry Christie administration (2002–2007), the portfolio was held by Neville Wisdom, who at various points served as Minister of Youth, Sports and Culture and, after a reshuffle, as Minister of Youth, Sports and Housing.

After the Free National Movement (FNM) returned to power in the 2007 general election, lawyer Desmond Bannister was appointed minister in the Hubert Ingraham administration. He dealt with issues such as compliance with international anti-doping standards and the development of sports facilities and events. In December 2009 Bannister moved to the Ministry of Education, and Charles Maynard – previously Minister of State for Culture – was promoted to full cabinet rank as minister. He was credited with a three-year tenure during which he oversaw preparations for the Thomas A. Robinson National Stadium and promoted the use of sport and cultural events to support tourism.

Following the victory of the Progressive Liberal Party (PLP) in the 2012 election, podiatrist Daniel Johnson was appointed minister. During his tenure, which ended with the May 2017 election, the ministry advanced the "Sports in Paradise" sports-tourism brand and played a central role in securing and preparirg to host major events such as the 2017 Commonwealth Youth Games and the IAAF World Relays.

After the FNM under Hubert Minnis returned to office in May 2017, Michael Pintard, MP for Marco City, was sworn in as minister, serving until a July 2018 reshuffle that moved him to the Ministry of Agriculture and Marine Resources. In July 2018 he was succeeded by Lanisha Rolle, the first woman to hold the post. She resigned in February 2021 and later faced bribery charges. Her resignation followed a lockdown of the ministry ordered by Minnis amid an ongoing audit of the National Sports Authority.

On 24 February 2021 Iram Lewis, MP for Central Grand Bahama and a former Olympic sprinter, was appointed minister. He prioritised the reintroduction of the Bahamas Games and closer coordination with sports federations and cultural groups, and held the portfolio until the September 2021 general election, after which the Hubert Minnis administration left office.

Following the 2021 election, the PLP formed government under Prime Minister Philip Davis. Mario Bowleg, a former banker and basketball administrator elected as MP for Garden Hills, was appointed minister on 22 September 2021. He has promoted the expansion of community sports facilities, further development of the "Sports in Paradise" sports-tourism brand, and stronger partnerships with sports federations and the Ministry of Tourism. Under Bowleg the ministry has continued to support major events such as the CARIFTA Games, domestic league competitions and cultural festivals.

== Mandate and structure ==
The Ministry of Youth, Sports and Culture is responsible for developing and implementing policies and programmes that provide a coordinated national framework for youth development, sports and cultural affairs. Its work is generally divided into three broad areas:

- Youth – national youth policy, support for youth organisations and youth leaders, and programmes such as school-holiday camps, apprenticeship and job-readiness schemes, and National Youth Month.
- Sports – national sports policy, cooperation with sports federations and the National Sports Authority, management and upgrading of facilities, support for national teams at regional and international competitions, and sports-tourism initiatives under the Sports in Paradise brand.
- Culture – promotion of Bahamian arts and performing arts, oversight of festivals such as Junkanoo and the National Arts Festival, and support for creative-industries and heritage initiatives.

The ministry is headquartered in the "BOB Building" on Thompson Boulevard in Oakes Field, Nassau. Its internal structure has included a Division or Department of Youth, a Department of Sports and a cultural affairs or Department of Culture unit responsible for arts programming, festivals and heritage-related initiatives. The ministry also provides financial assistance and grants to athletes, coaches, sporting organisations and creative practitioners to support training, participation in competitions and educational opportunities.

== Ministers ==
The following persons have served as ministers responsible for youth, sports and culture:

Progressive Liberal Party (PLP) Free National Movement (FNM)

Ministers of Youth, Sports and Culture
	Minister	Party	Prime Minister	Start	End
1	Kendal Wellington Nottage	PLP	Lynden Pindling	1977	1984
2	Livingston Nathaniel Coakley	PLP	Lynden Pindling	1984	1987
3	Peter John Bethel	PLP	Lynden Pindling	1987	1990
4	Norman Rupert Gay	PLP	Lynden Pindling	1990	1992
5	Algernon S. P. B. Allen	FNM	Hubert Ingraham	1992	1997
6	Ivy L. Dumont	FNM	Hubert Ingraham	1997	2001
7	Zhivargo S. Laing	FNM	Hubert Ingraham	1997	2001
8	Dion A. Foulkes	FNM	Hubert Ingraham	2001	2002
9	Neville Walter Wisdom	PLP	Perry Christie	2002	2007
10	Carl W. Bethel	FNM	Hubert Ingraham	2007	2008
11	Byron Shelton Woodside	FNM	Hubert Ingraham	2007	2008
12	Thomas Desmond Bannister	FNM	Hubert Ingraham	2008	2009
13	Charles T. Maynard	FNM	Hubert Ingraham	2009	2012
14	Daniel D. Johnson	PLP	Perry Christie	2012	2017
15	Michael Pintard	FNM	Hubert Minnis	15 May 2017	4 July 2018
16	Lanisha Rolle	FNM	Hubert Minnis	4 July 2018	February 2021
17	Iram Lewis	FNM	Hubert Minnis	March 2021	September 2021
18	Mario Bowleg	PLP	Philip Davis	22 September 2021	present

== See also ==
- Cabinet of the Bahamas
- Ministry of Health (The Bahamas)
- Sport in the Bahamas
- Culture of the Bahamas
