= Hepburn (surname) =

- Pronunciation: /ˈhɛpˌbɜːrn/
- Language: English

Origin
- Derivation: from a placename in Northumberland
- Meaning: "high place beside the water"

Hepburn is a family name of the Anglo-Scottish border, that is associated with a variety of notable people, eponyms, places, and things. Although commonly a Scottish name, its origins lie to the south of the border in the north of England. Specifically, the name is thought to have derived from Hepburn or Hebron in Northumberland or Hebburn in Tyne and Wear. The origins of the name are suggested to be the same as that of Hebborne from the Old English words heah ("high") and byrgen ("burial mound"). Alternatively it could mean something along the lines of "high place beside the water", as the word burn is a still widely used in Northumbrian and Scots for stream.

Next to Chillingham Castle there remains a bastle tower where the family originated. This was the seat of a line of the family until the eighteenth century when that branch died out, having left only a female heir. However, it is as the Earls of Bothwell that the Hepburn family are perhaps best remembered. This branch of the family originated in Lothian when a Hepburn was granted land having saved the Earl of March from a horse that had lost control. This family first became the Lords of Hailes before being granted the Earldom of Bothwell.

There were also Hepburns of Waughton, thought by some to have branched off from the Hailes line, thought by others to predate it. Another line was the Hepburns of Beanston, and yet another was the Hepburns of Athelstaneford. All of these families were prominent in various ways at various junctures of Scottish history, but all were primarily located around the East Lothian area.

== Scottish nobles ==
- Patrick Hepburn, 1st Lord of Hailes (died 1483)
- Adam Hepburn, Master of Hailes (died 1479), son of Patrick, 1st Lord of Hailes
- Patrick Hepburn, 1st Earl of Bothwell (died 1508), son of Adam, Master of Hailes
- Adam Hepburn of Craggis (died 1513), son of Adam, Master of Hailes
- George Hepburn (bishop) (died 1513), son of Adam, Master of Hailes
- Adam Hepburn, 2nd Earl of Bothwell (died 1513), son of Patrick, 1st Earl of Bothwell
- Patrick Hepburn, 3rd Earl of Bothwell (1512–1556), son of Adam, 2nd Earl of Bothwell
- James Hepburn, 4th Earl of Bothwell (c. 1534–1578), son of Patrick, 3rd Earl of Bothwell, and husband of Mary, Queen of Scots
- James Hepburn (bishop) (died 1524), Scottish prelate and administrator
- Francis Stewart Hepburn, 5th Earl of Bothwell (before 1563–1612), nephew of James, 4th Earl of Bothwell

== Politics ==
- A. Barton Hepburn (1846–1922), American banker and politician
- Bernard Rickart Hepburn (1876–1939), member of the Canadian House of Commons
- Erecia Hepburn, Bahamian politician
- James de Congalton Hepburn (fl. 1940s), Speaker of the Ontario (Canada) Legislature
- Jamie Hepburn (born 1979), member of the Scottish Parliament
- Mitchell Hepburn (1896–1953), Premier of Ontario, Canada
- Moses Hepburn (1832–1897), American politician and businessman
- Patrick Buchan-Hepburn (1901–1974), Scottish politician
- Robert Rickart Hepburn Member of Parliament for Kincardineshire 1768–1774
- Stephen Hepburn (born 1959), English Member of Parliament
- William Peters Hepburn (1833–1916), American congressman for Iowa, author of the Hepburn Act of 1906

== Academia ==
- Alexa Hepburn, English social psychologist
- Andrew Dousa Hepburn (1830–1921), president of Miami University and Davidson College
- Charles A. Hepburn (born 1891–1971), Scottish businessman and philanthropist
- Ian Hepburn (1902–74), British schoolmaster, botanist, ecologist and author
- James Hepburn (1811–1869), British ornithologist
- James Bonaventure Hepburn (1573–1620), Scottish Catholic scholar
- James Curtis Hepburn (1815–1911), American linguist, devised a romanization system for Japanese

== Arts and entertainment ==
- Kate Hepburn (1947–2024), British graphic designer and artist
- Katharine Hepburn (1907–2003), American actress
- Kathleen Hepburn, Canadian screenwriter and film director
- Audrey Hepburn (née Ruston) (1929–1993), Belgian-born British actress
- Barton Hepburn (1906–1955), American actor
- Dee Hepburn (born 1961), Scottish actress
- Alex Hepburn (born 1986), British singer

== Sports ==
- Brandon Hepburn (born 1989), American football player
- Chucky Hepburn (born 2003), American basketball player
- Craig Hepburn (born 1969), Bahamian long-jumper
- Doug Hepburn (1926–2000), Canadian weightlifter
- James Hepburn (1876–1945), Scottish-American professional golfer
- Michael Hepburn (born 1991), Australian track and road cyclist
- Ralph Hepburn (1896–1948), American motorcycle and racecar driver
- Ross Hepburn (born 1972), Scottish curler

== Military ==
- Allan Hepburn (1896–1975), Australian World War I flying ace
- Arthur Japy Hepburn (1877–1964), US Navy Admiral
- Sir John Hepburn (c. 1598–1636), Scottish soldier, fought for Sweden and France

== Trade Unions ==
- Thomas Hepburn (c. 1795–1864), English miner and union founder
