= Norman Rupert Gay =

Bahamian politician and sports administrator

- Born: 31 January 1941; San Salvador Island, Bahamas
- Died: 20 September 2025 (aged 84); Nassau, Bahamas
- Occupations: Physician, politician, sports administrator

Norman Rupert Gay (31 January 1941 – 20 September 2025) was a Bahamian physician, politician, athlete, and sports administrator. He served in the House of Assembly of the Bahamas, was a Cabinet minister, and was also active in Bahamian volleyball, bodybuilding, boxing administration, and Olympic sport governance.

== Medicine and civil service ==
Norman Gay was born on 31 January 1941 to James A. and Amy (née Nairn) Gay.

He studied at the Canadian Union Medical School and graduated from Loma Linda University in 1965. Later, he obtained an MBA from the University of Miami.

He worked at Princess Margaret Hospital and ran a longstanding private practice.

In the 1970s, he became a member of the International Academy of Preventive Medicine.

In later years, he served as medical director of the Bahamas Health Institute and promoted preventive and holistic medicine through the Bahamas Anti-Aging Medical Institute.

== Political career ==
In 1973, Gay won the Bain Town by-election, becoming the first Bahamian elected in the independent Bahamas.

He later served as Minister of Health from 1984 to 1990. During his tenure, he promoted preventive health policy. Bahamian sources also credit him with helping establish the Bahamas AIDS Secretariat and a nursing school that later became part of the nursing programme at the College of The Bahamas. Norman Gay also chaired the Pan American Health Organization (PAHO) and was a presenter at the World Health Organization (WHO).

He later served as Minister of Youth, Sports and Culture.

== Sports administration ==
Gay was active in sport as a volleyball player and bodybuilder. Over the course of his career, he served as president of the Bahamas Volleyball Federation, the Bahamas Bodybuilding Federation, the Caribbean Bodybuilding Federation, and the Bahamas Confederation of Amateur Sports. He also chaired the Bahamas Boxing Commission.

From 1972 to 1973, he briefly served as president of the Bahamas Olympic Committee.

Gay was inducted into the National Sports Hall of Fame in 2013.

== Later years and death ==
In his later years, Gay remained active in health and sports-related public life.

He died in Nassau on 20 September 2025.
