= Neobracea bahamensis =

Scientific classification
- Kingdom: Plantae
- Clade: Tracheophytes
- Clade: Angiosperms
- Clade: Eudicots
- Clade: Asterids
- Order: Gentianales
- Family: Apocynaceae
- Genus: Neobracea
- Species: N. bahamensis

Binomial name
- Neobracea bahamensis Britton

Synonyms
- Bracea bahamensis Britton [nomen illegitimum]

Species of flowering plant

Neobracea bahamensis is a species of flowering plant in the family Apocynaceae that is endemic to Cuba and several islands in the Bahamas including Andros, New Providence, Cat Island, Great Exuma, Long Cay and Crooked Island. In its native environment, the plant grows in coastal thickets, pine barrens and along the borders of brackish swamps. It can also be found along roadways on these islands.

Neobracea bahamensis is a shrub and grows to about 1 metre (39 in) high with greyish brown branches. Its leaves are 4–10 centimetres (1.6–3.9 in) long and are firm in texture, oblong or obtuse in shape, narrowing at the base. The leaves are clustered at the tips of branches. The flowers appear with the leaves and have a white corolla with a reddish throat. The flower's five petals are fused, forming a tube. The petals form a pinwheel shape, overlapping to one side. There are five fused stamens, a superior ovary, two locules, and many ovules. The mature fruits are brown and are dispersed using tufts of hair on the seeds.

This species, along with other Bahamian-endemic plant species, is an ecologically important part of iguana habitats in the Bahamas. Economically, the flowers can reportedly be used as flavouring for rice in its native range.
