= East Grand Bahama (Bahamas Parliament constituency) =

Bahamas parliamentary constituency

- Constituency
- East Grand Bahama on a map of the 2021 election
- District: East Grand Bahama
- Electorate: 3,935 (2011); 6,561 (2021)

Current constituency
- Created: 2012
- Seats: 1
- Party: Free National Movement
- Member: Kingsley Smith

East Grand Bahama is a parliamentary constituency represented in the House of Assembly of the Bahamas. It elects one member of parliament (MP) using the first past the post electoral system. It has been represented by Kwasi Thompson from the Free National Movement since 2021.

== Geography ==
The constituency comprises the district of East Grand Bahama.

== Members of Parliament ==
Election	Parliament	Candidate	Party
2012	12th Bahamian Parliament	Peter Turnquest	FNM
2017	13th Bahamian Parliament	Peter Turnquest	FNM
2021	14th Bahamian Parliament	Kwasi Thompson	FNM
2026	15th Bahamian Parliament	Kwasi Thompson	FNM

== Election results ==
2021
Party	Candidate	Votes	%	±%
FNM	Kwasi Thompson	2,090	48.76	▼17.24
PLP	James Rolle-Turner	1,686	39.34	▲10.34
COI	Albertha Cooper	372	8.68	
Kingdom Government Movement	Kevin King	96	2.24	
Bahamas Constitution Party	Charlene Jones	42	0.98	
Turnout		4,286	65.33	
FNM hold				

== See also ==
- Constituencies of the Bahamas
