= West Grand Bahama (Bahamas Parliament constituency) =

Bahamas parliamentary constituency

- Constituency
- West Grand Bahama and Bimini is 25 on this map of the 2021 election
- District: West Grand Bahama and Bimini
- Electorate: 4,006 (2011); 5,700 (2021)

Current constituency
- Seats: 1
- Party: Progressive Liberal Party
- Member: Kingsley Smith

West Grand Bahama is a parliamentary constituency represented in the House of Assembly of the Bahamas. It elects one member of parliament (MP) using the first past the post electoral system. It has been represented by Kingsley Smith from the Progressive Liberal Party since 2023.

Having Bimini being moved into a new constituency, this constituency was renamed from West Grand Bahama and Bimini upon the 2026 Bahamian general election.

== History ==
In October 2025, the Boundaries Commission was considering creating new constituencies by dividing the existing West Grand Bahama and Bimini seat, citing the size of the electorate and Bimini's population growth. The combined West Grand Bahama and Bimini constituency had been criticised by residents for pairing islands with different priorities.

In its report dated 29 December 2025, the Constituencies Commission said the new seat was formed from areas that had previously been part of the West Grand Bahama and Bimini constituency and the North Andros and Berry Islands constituency. The report also said that no public consultations or meetings were held during the commission's work.

Ahead of the 2026 election, the commission was also reported to be considering combining Bimini with the Berry Islands into a new constituency as part of a broader review aimed at a fairer distribution of voters, with reference to constitutional requirements on population-based boundaries. On 8 January 2026, the commission's report was tabled in Parliament, confirming the creation of a separate Bimini and Berry Islands seat and increasing the number of constituencies from 39 to 41.

== Geography ==
The constituency comprises the districts of West Grand Bahama.

== Members of Parliament ==
Election	Parliament	Candidate	Party
As West Grand Bahama and Bimini
2002	10th Bahamian Parliament	Obie Wilchcombe	Progressive Liberal Party
2007	11th Bahamian Parliament	Obie Wilchcombe	Progressive Liberal Party
2012	12th Bahamian Parliament	Obie Wilchcombe	Progressive Liberal Party
2017	13th Bahamian Parliament	Obie Wilchcombe	Progressive Liberal Party
2021	14th Bahamian Parliament	Obie Wilchcombe	Progressive Liberal Party
2023 by-election	14th Bahamian Parliament	Kingsley Smith	Progressive Liberal Party
As West Grand Bahama
2026	15th Bahamian Parliament	Kingsley Smith	Progressive Liberal Party

== See also ==
- Constituencies of the Bahamas
