= Travis Robinson (politician) =

Bahamian politician

The Hon. Travis Robinson MP

Parliamentary Secretary for the Ministry of Tourism and Aviation
- In office 2020–2021

Member of Parliament for Bain and Grants Town
- In office 2017–2021
- Preceded by: Bernard Nottage
- Succeeded by: Wayde Watson
- Majority: 1,000+

Personal details
- Born: Travis Lamar Robinson; 30 November 1994 (age 31) Nassau, Bahamas
- Party: Free National Movement
- Education: University of the Bahamas

Travis Lamar Robinson (born 30 November 1994) is a Bahamian Free National Movement politician who was the Member of Parliament (MP) for Bain and Grants Town from 2017 to 2021. Elected at the age of 22, he became the youngest MP in the history of the Bahamas as well as CARICOM at large.

== Early life and education ==
Robinson was born in the local area to Samuel and Maxine Robinson and raised by his adoptive mother, Ianne Seymour-Bain. He attended and was Head Boy at Stephen Dillet Primary, T.A. Thompson Junior High, and C.R. Walker Senior High School. He graduated with a Bachelor of Science in Tourism Management from the University of the Bahamas. He has taken and led courses with the United Nations and Royal Bahamian Defence Force, and sat on the Culinary Hospitality Management Institute Senate.

== Career ==
Robinson got involved in politics at a young age, serving two terms in the Bahamian Youth Parliament. He founded the tourism consultant firm Consult Tourism Bahamas Ltd as well as the Rising Star Organization.

Robinson defeated the incumbent since 2007 Bernard Nottage in the 2017 Bahamian general election with a majority of over 1 thousand votes. He was appointed Parliamentary Secretary for the Ministry of Tourism and Aviation from 2017. He was removed from the cabinet alongside Frederick McAlpine in 2018 for voting against the government's 12% rise in VAT, but then reappointed in 2020. In the 2021 Bahamian general election, Robinson was unseated by Wayde Watson.

In the 2026 Bahamian general election, he was the FNM candidate for Fort Charlotte but lost to Sebastian Bastian from the Progressive Liberal Party (PLP).
