= Frederick McAlpine =

Bahamian politician

Member of the Parliament of the Bahamas for Pineridge
- In office 10 May 2017 – 16 September 2021
- Preceded by: Michael Darville
- Succeeded by: Ginger Moxey

Personal details
- Party: Independent
- Other political affiliations: Free National Movement (previously)

Frederick A. McAlpine is a Bahamian politician who served as a member of parliament from 2017 to 2021.

== Early life and career ==
McAlpine is a reverend. He is affiliated with the Pentecostal church. McAlpine was chairman of the Hotel Corporation Board.

== Political career ==
McAlpine ran as an independent candidate in the 2002 Bahamian general election in Marco City but was defeated by Pleasant Bridgewater.

In the 2017 Bahamian general election, McAlpine was elected for the Free National Movement (FNM) in the constituency of Pineridge defeating Michael Darville. After the new government was formed he was disappointed about not being appointed to the Cabinet. In 2018, he was sacked as chairman of the Hotel Corporation Board after he voted against an increase in value-added tax. He, along with Vaughn Miller, said they would not quit the FNM over the issue. McAlpine criticised his governments budget. In 2019, he helped distribute relief to hurricane victims in Freeport.

He was a critic of former Prime Minister Hubert Minnis. He claimed that a trip MP Adrian Gibson took to London, England was unnecessary at the expense of Bahamian taxpayers. He abstained from voting in favour of the government's Immigration Amendment Bill 2019. He said that he would abstain on any vote of no-confidence put by the Official Opposition. He thought his party was looking dishonest. He called his party a "Pinocchio government". In August 2019, the Free National Movement's Pineridge Constituency Association called on McAlpine to resign from the party.

In July 2021, McAlpine was outspoken about the impact of Hurricane Dorian and the COVID-19 pandemic on Grand Bahama. Issues he has spoken on include the Grand Bahama Port Authority.

In the 2021 Bahamian general election, he stood as an independent candidate but was defeated by Progressive Liberal Party candidate Ginger Moxey. He came in second place and outpolled the new FNM candidate. After the election he decried against "partisan politics". In 2024, he announced he would again stand as an independent candidate in the Pineridge constituency. He stood as a candidate in the 2026 Bahamian general election. He faced Ginger Moxey in the general election.
