= George Thomas Bethune-Baker =

English entomologist (1857–1944)

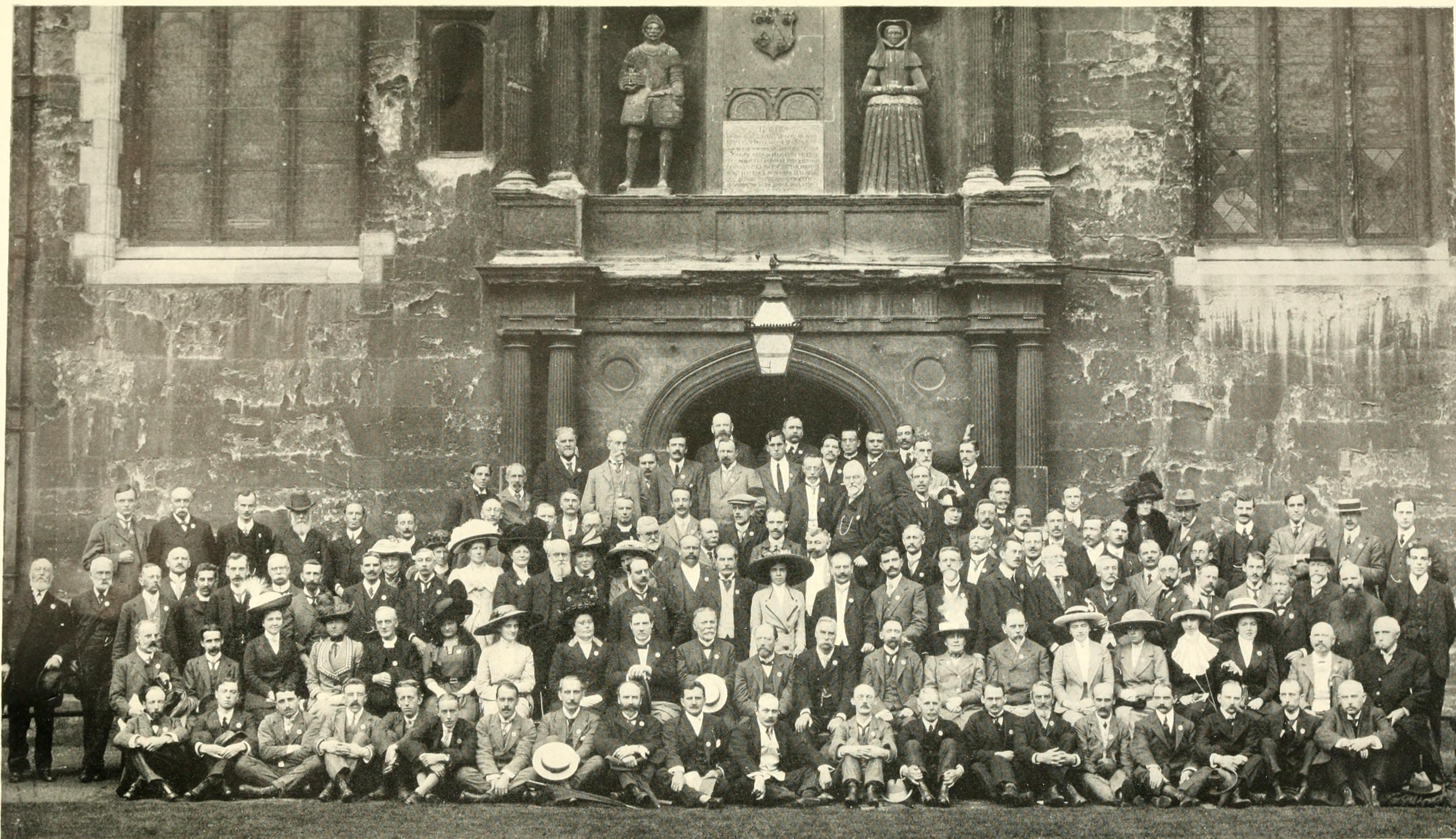
- Bethune-Baker, first standing row, third from left, at the International Entomological Congress in 1912
- Born: July 20, 1857; Birmingham, England
- Died: December 1, 1944 (aged 87); Eastbourne, England
- Known for: Specialising in Lepidoptera (butterflies and moths), particularly the family Lycaenidae (blues, coppers, hairstreaks).
- Scientific career
- Fields: Entomology
- Author abbrev. (zoology): Bethune-Baker

George Thomas Bethune-Baker (20 July 1857, in Birmingham – 1 December 1944, in Eastbourne) was an English entomologist who specialised in Lepidoptera, especially those in the family Lycaenidae of butterflies.

His collection is partly in the Museum of Zoology Cambridge University and partly in the Natural History Museum, London.

== Works ==
Partial list. See Wikispecies (below) for fuller list.

- Bethune-Baker, G. T. 1903 On new Species of Lycaenidae from West Africa Annals and Magazine of Natural History (7) 12 : 324–334
- Bethune-Baker, G. T. 1908 Descriptions of new species of butterflies of the division Rhopalocera from Africa and from New Guinea. Proceedings of the Zoological Society of London 1908:110–126.
- Bethune-Baker, G. T. 1908 Descriptions of new Rhopalocera from the Upper Congo. Annals and Magazine of Natural History (8)469–482.
- Bethune-Baker, G. T. 1910 A revision of the African species of Lycaenesthes group of the Lycaenidae Trans. ent. Soc. Lond. 1910 : 1–84, pl. 1–13.
- Bethune-Baker, G. T. 1923 A monograph of the genus Catochrysops Boisduval (Auctorum). Transactions of the Entomological Society of London 1922:275–366. online

Bethune-Baker was a fellow of the Royal Entomological Society and president 1913–1914.
