= Michael Darville =

Minister of Health and a Bahamian politician

Member of the Parliament of the Bahamas for Tall Pines
- Incumbent
- Assumed office 2021
- Preceded by: Donal Saunders

Member of the Parliament of the Bahamas for Pineridge
- In office 2012–2017
- Preceded by: Kwasi Thompson
- Succeeded by: Frederick McAlpine

Personal details
- Party: Progressive Liberal Party
- Website: https://www.bahamas.gov.bs/team/dr-the-hon-michael-ronald-darville

Michael Ronald Darville is a Bahamian politician from the Progressive Liberal Party.

== Career ==
In the 2021 Bahamian general election, he was elected in Tall Pines. He is a doctor by profession.

Darville was formerly a Grand Bahama based MP and Minister of Health. In the 2017 Bahamian general election, he was defeated by Frederick McAlpine.

== See also ==
- 14th Bahamian Parliament
