= McLeans Town =

Town in East Grand Bahama, The Bahamas

- Location within Bahamas
- Country: The Bahamas
- Island: Grand Bahama
- District: East Grand Bahama
- Constituency: East Grand Bahama

McLeans Town is a settlement in East Grand Bahama district in The Bahamas. It is the easternmost settlement on the island of Grand Bahama and is 30 minutes away from Abaco Islands by ferry.

== Economy ==
McLeans Town is known as a tourist destination.

== Politics ==
McLeans Town is part of the East Grand Bahama constituency for elections to the House of Assembly of the Bahamas.
