= Ann E. Percentie =

Bahamian politician

Member of the Parliament of the Bahamas for Pineridge
- In office 2002–2007
- Preceded by: Cornelius A. Smith
- Succeeded by: Kwasi Thompson

Personal details
- Party: Progressive Liberal Party

Ann Elizabeth Percentie-Russell is a Bahamian politician who served as a member of parliament from 2002 to 2007 for the Progressive Liberal Party.

== Biography ==
Percentie served as Parliamentary Secretary in the Office of the Prime Minister. In 2012, she was robbed. She was made member of the Order of the British Empire (MBE) in the 2022 Birthday Honours.
