= Mack Town =

Mack Town (26.6833°N 78.9667°W) is a town in West Grand Bahama, in The Bahamas.

== See also ==
- Grand Bahama
- West Grand Bahama
