= Sylvanus Petty =

Bahamian politician

Member of the Parliament of the Bahamas for North Eleuthera
- Incumbent
- Assumed office 2021

Personal details
- Party: Progressive Liberal Party

Sylvanus Clifford Edward Petty is a Bahamian politician from the Progressive Liberal Party.

== Career ==
In the 2021 Bahamian general election, he was elected in North Eleuthera. He currently serves as Deputy Speaker in the House of Assembly of the Parliament of the Bahamas.

On November 16, 2023, he resigned as executive chairman of the Water and Sewerage Corporation (WSC).

In April 2025, Petty announced that he will not seek re-election for the North Eleuthera Constituency citing his desire to take a mental break and focus of family priorities.

Petty was handily reelected in the 2026 General Election as the PLP Member of Parliament for North Eleuthera a feat not obtained by the Progressive Liberal Party in decades.

== See also ==
- 14th Bahamian Parliament
