= Sweeting Cay =

- Location within Bahamas
- Coordinates: 26°37′08″N 77°51′48″W
- Country: Bahamas
- Island: Grand Bahama
- District: East Grand Bahama

Population (2012)
  - Total: 516
- Time zone: UTC-5 (Eastern Time Zone)
- Area code: 242

Sweeting Cay is a town in the Bahamas, located on Grand Bahama island. It has a population of 516 (2012 estimates). Sweeting Cay is a small fishing village that is the easternmost on the island.

It is 180 km north of the capital Nassau. Sweeting Cay is 3 meters above sea level. It is north of East Grand Bahama National Park.
