= Obie Wilchcombe =

Bahamian politician (1959 - 2023)

Member of the Parliament of the Bahamas for West Grand Bahama and Bimini
- In office 2002 – 25 September 2023
- Succeeded by: Kingsley Smith

Personal details
- Born: 1959
- Died: 25 September 2023 (aged 64)
- Party: Progressive Liberal Party
- Education: Queen's College, Nassau

Obediah (Obie) Hercules Wilchcombe (14 November 1958 - 25 September 2023) was a Bahamian journalist, politician, and Cabinet Minister.

== Early life and education ==
Wilchcombe was born in Grand Bahama on 14 November 1958, the son of Jackson and Mary (née Arthur) Wilchcombe. He attended Queen's College high school in Nassau, Bahamas.

== Career ==
=== Journalism ===
Wilchcombe began his career in 1975 when he joined the Broadcasting Corporation of the Bahamas as a journalist.

He became a nationally-known journalist, rising through the ranks to hold senior positions, serving as Deputy Director of News, News Director, and from 1990 as Assistant General Manager. He worked for the network for 25 years.

At one point, he was jailed for contempt when he refused to reveal a source to the Court.

=== Politics ===
Wilchcombe was appointed to the Senate of the Bahamas in 1994. In 1995, he became Chairman of the Progressive Liberal Party (PLP).

In 2002, Wilchcombe was first elected to office as the Member of Parliament for West Grand Bahama and Bimini. He served as Minister of Tourism in two Christie governments. During his ministry, the country saw a record rise in tourists and tourist dollars and four new airline partnerships.

In 2004, he survived Hurricane Frances reportedly saved many people. In 2017, Wilchcombe lost his seat but he was re-elected in 2021. He served as the Minister of Social Services, Information and Broadcasting from 2021 until his death in 2023.

=== Controversies ===
Wilchcombe was a close friend of John Travolta and Kelly Preston, and was accused of extortion following their son's death in the Bahamas in 2009.

Following the death of Queen Elizabeth II in 2022, Wilchcombe expressed his desire for the nation to reject the British monarchy.

== Death ==
Wilchcombe died on 25 September 2023 in Grand Bahama at the age of 64. He became only the third Minister to die in office in the Bahamas since independence. A by-election was held for his vacated seat, which was won by Kingsley Smith.
