= West Grand Bahama =

District of The Bahamas

- Coordinates: 25°4′N 77°20′W
- Country: Bahamas
- Island: Grand Bahama
- Established: 1996

Government
  - Type: District Council
  - Chief Councillor: Calvis Bartlett
- Time zone: UTC−5 (EST)
  - Summer (DST): UTC−4 (EDT)
- Area code: 242

West Grand Bahama is one of 31 districts of the Bahamas. The district covers the entire western portion of Grand Bahama island, excluding the city of Freeport, which forms its own district. Communities within West Grand Bahama include the settlements of Mack Town, Hunters, Lewis Yard, Pinder's Point, Eight Mile Rock, Hepburn Town, Bartlett Hill, Hanna Hill, Pine Dale, Martin Town, Russell Town, Jones Town, Sea Grape, Holmes Rock, Bootle Bay and the westernmost settlement of West End.

West End's development has been dominated by a hotel and marina located at the western tip of Grand Bahama Island and now known as Old Bahama Bay. The Florida-based Ginn Company sought to develop a new tourism project in the area. In 2009, the now former Ginn Company defaulted on a $650 million Credit Suisse which a major portion of the loan was used to fund Ginn Sur Mer. The project once pegged at $5 billion would have included thousands of home sites, 4 star resort hotel, two golf courses, airport and mega yacht marina has now come to a complete halt. Bogged down with numerous lawsuits filed by disgruntled buyers who alleged that Robert (Bobby) Ginn sold land that appears to have been owned by several Bahamian families who have resided for generations in the historic settlement. The lawsuits filed in the U.S. and Bahamas courts are still ongoing.

As for the name of each settlement, they basically got their name from the families that settled there. For example, Pinder's Point was inhabited by the Pinders. Russell town by the Russells and so on. At one point, there was even a town called Cooper's town but over time, the Pinders became the dominating surname and absorbed Cooper's town, creating one settlement called Pinder's Point.

== Subdivisions ==
West Grand Bahama is divided into four town areas or townships (for administrative purposes). Each township has its own chairperson. They are:

- Township of West End
- Township of Eight Mile Rock West
- Township of Eight Mile Rock East
- Township of Pinder's Point

== Politics ==
For elections to the Parliament of the Bahamas, it is part of the West Grand Bahama and Bimini constituency.
