= James Rolle-Turner =

Bahamian politician

Member of the Senate of the Bahamas
- Incumbent
- Assumed office 6 October 2021

Personal details
- Party: Progressive Liberal Party

James Rolle-Turner is a Bahamian politician from the Progressive Liberal Party (PLP). He is a member of the Senate.

== Career ==
He was the PLP candidate for East Grand Bahama in the 2021 Bahamian general election.
