= Garden Hills (Bahamas Parliament constituency) =

Bahamas parliamentary constituency

- Constituency
- Garden Hills is 16 on this map of the 2021 election
- District: New Providence
- Electorate: 4,116 (2011)

Current constituency
- Seats: 1
- Party: Progressive Liberal Party
- Member: Mario Bowleg

Garden Hills is a parliamentary constituency represented in the House of Assembly of the Bahamas. It elects one member of parliament (MP) using the first past the post electoral system. It has been represented by Mario Bowleg from the Progressive Liberal Party since 2021.

== Geography ==
The constituency comprises the Garden Hills area of Nassau, the capital and largest city of the Bahamas.

== Members of Parliament ==
Election	Parliament	Elected MP	Party
1997	9th Bahamian Parliament	Rome Italia Johnson	Free National Movement
2002	10th Bahamian Parliament	Veronica Owens	Progressive Liberal Party
2007	11th Bahamian Parliament	Brensil Rolle	Free National Movement
2012	12th Bahamian Parliament	Kendal Major	Progressive Liberal Party
2017	13th Bahamian Parliament	Brensil Rolle	Free National Movement
2021	14th Bahamian Parliament	Mario Bowleg	Progressive Liberal Party
2026	15th Bahamian Parliament	Mario Bowleg	Progressive Liberal Party

== Election results ==
2021
Party	Candidate	Votes	%	±%
PLP	Mario Bowleg	1,780	58.38	▲21.38
FNM	Stephen Greenslade	944	30.96	▼24.04
COI	Richmond Mckinney	187	6.13	
Independent	Boykin Smith	44	1.44	
DNA	Derek Smith	41	1.34	▼5.66
Bahamas Constitution Party	Sharell Mcintosh	29	0.95	▼0.05
Independent	Kareem Hanchell	11	0.36	
Kingdom Government Movement	Sinisha Thompson	9	0.30	
Grand Commonwealth Party	Michelle Wildgoose	4	0.13	
Turnout		3,049	57.30	
PLP gain from FNM				

== See also ==
- Constituencies of the Bahamas
