= Ginger Moxey =

Bahamian businesswoman and politician

Member of the Parliament of the Bahamas for Pineridge
- Incumbent
- Assumed office 16 September 2021
- Preceded by: Frederick McAlpine

Personal details
- Party: Progressive Liberal Party

Ginger Maria Moxey is a Bahamian businesswoman and politician. She has been the Minister for Grand Bahama and Member of Parliament for Pineridge since 2021. She previously served as vice president of Grand Bahama Port Authority, resigning from the position in 2014 to pursue other ventures.

In 2025 she was boasting of $3 billion of investment in the Bahamas.

== Electoral history ==
General Election 2021: Pineridge
| Party | Candidate | Votes | % | ±% |
|---|---|---|---|---|
| PLP | Ginger Moxey | | | |
| Independent | Frederick McAlpine | | | N/A |
| FNM | Welbourne Bootle | | | |
| GCP | Tavia Lowe | | | New |
| KGM | Belinda Williams | | | New |
| Independent | Shan Wilson | | | New |
| Turnout | | | | |
| Registered electors | | | | |
| PLP gain from Independent | | | | |

== See also ==
- 14th Bahamian Parliament
