= Neobracea =

Scientific classification
- Kingdom: Plantae
- Clade: Tracheophytes
- Clade: Angiosperms
- Clade: Eudicots
- Clade: Asterids
- Order: Gentianales
- Family: Apocynaceae
- Subfamily: Apocynoideae
- Tribe: Malouetieae
- Genus: Neobracea; Britton 1920

Synonyms
- Bracea Britton 1905, illegitimate homonym, not King 1895

Genus of plants

Neobracea is a genus of plant in the family Apocynaceae first described as a genus in 1905. It was first given the name Bracea, but this turned out to be an illegitimate homonym. In other words, somebody else had already used it for another plant. Neobracea is native to Cuba and the Bahamas.

Species

1. Neobracea acunana Lippold - E Cuba
2. Neobracea angustifolia Britton - W Cuba
3. Neobracea bahamensis (Britton) Britton - Bahamas, Cuba
4. Neobracea ekmanii Urb. - E Cuba
5. Neobracea howardii Woodson - EC Cuba
6. Neobracea martiana Borhidi & O.Muñiz - E Cuba
7. Neobracea susannina Borhidi - E Cuba
8. Neobracea valenzuelana (A.Rich.) Urb. - Cuba
