= Jamahl Strachan =

Bahamian politician (born 1988)

Member of the Parliament of the Bahamas for Nassau Village
- Incumbent
- Assumed office 2021

Personal details
- Party: Progressive Liberal Party
- Website: https://www.leonlundy.com/

Jamahl Strachan (born 1988) is a Bahamian politician from the Progressive Liberal Party.

== Career ==
In the 2021 Bahamian general election, he was elected in Nassau Village.

He is Parliamentary Secretary in the Ministry of Foreign Affairs.

== See also ==
- 14th Bahamian Parliament
