= East Grand Bahama =

District in the Bahamas

Coordinates: 26°40′N 78°08′W

The Location of the District of East Grand Bahama

East Grand Bahama is a district of The Bahamas, situated on the eastern part of the island of Grand Bahama, with a population collectively of 11,411 people.

The local government seat for the district is in the settlement of High Rock, a fairly small town. It is situated approximately 40 miles (64 km) east of the City of Freeport, and 20 miles (32 km) from the easternmost settlement of McLeans Town. Other settlements of East Grand Bahama include Rocky Creek, Pelican Point, Gambier Point and Sweeting Cay.

For many years the United States Air Force maintained a missile tracking station near High Rock, which was used mainly in connection with all launches from Cape Canaveral FL and NASA's crewed space flights. The station was used as a base of operations for a film studio, Gold Rock Creek Enterprises, where filming took place for the Disney production of Pirates of the Caribbean: Dead Man's Chest and Pirates of the Caribbean: At World's End. The Bahamas Film Studios has one of the largest open water filming enclosures in the world, along with production offices and support facilities, such as property warehouses, wardrobe workshops and other covered space. The studio is still in development and will eventually add state-of-the-art sound stages, post-production facilities and a hands-on international film school.

== Politics ==
For elections to the Parliament of the Bahamas, it is part of the East Grand Bahama constituency.
