= Centreville (Bahamas Parliament constituency) =

Bahamas parliamentary constituency

- Constituency
- Centreville is 22 on this map of the 2021 election
- District: New Providence

Current constituency
- Seats: 1
- Party: Progressive Liberal Party
- Member: Jomo Campbell

Centreville is a parliamentary constituency represented in the House of Assembly of the Bahamas. It elects one member of parliament (MP) using the first past the post electoral system. It has been represented by Jomo Campbell from the Progressive Liberal Party since 2021.

It was known as New Providence East - Centreville in the 20th century.

== Geography ==
The constituency is based on the Centreville area of Nassau, the capital and largest city of the Bahamas.

== Demographics ==
4,444 registered voters in 2011.

== Members of Parliament ==
Election	Parliament	Candidate	Party
1977		Perry Christie	Progressive Liberal Party
1982		Perry Christie	Progressive Liberal Party
1987		Perry Christie	Progressive Liberal Party
1992		Perry Christie	Progressive Liberal Party
1997		Perry Christie	Progressive Liberal Party
2002		Perry Christie	Progressive Liberal Party
2007		Perry Christie	Progressive Liberal Party
2012		Perry Christie	Progressive Liberal Party
2017		Reece Chipman	Free National Movement
2021	14th Bahamian Parliament	Jomo Campbell	Progressive Liberal Party
2026	15th Bahamian Parliament	Jomo Campbell	Progressive Liberal Party

== Election results ==
2021
Party	Candidate	Votes	%	±%
PLP	Jomo Campbell	2,170	60.58	▲13.18
FNM	Courtney Coulibaly	609	18.69	
Independent	Reece Chipman (incumbent)	205	6.29	▼28..80
COI	Ambrose Nixon	200	6.14	
DNA	Frederick Sawyer	64	1.96	▼2.04
Grand Commonwealth Party	Arrie Percentie	11	0.34	
Turnout		3,259	62.46	
PLP gain from FNM				

== See also ==
- Constituencies of the Bahamas
