= Hunter, Grand Bahama =

Town in West Grand Bahama

Coordinates: 26.6833°N 78.9667°W

Hunters is a town in West Grand Bahama in The Bahamas. It is southwest of the islands' largest city, Freeport City.
