= Pinewood (Bahamas Parliament constituency) =

Bahamas parliamentary constituency

- Constituency
- Pinewood is 13 on this map of the 2021 election
- District: New Providence
- Electorate: 4,085 (2011); 5,374 (2021)

Current constituency
- Seats: 1
- Party: Progressive Liberal Party
- Member: Myles Laroda

Pinewood is a parliamentary constituency represented in the House of Assembly of the Bahamas. It elects one member of parliament (MP) using the first past the post electoral system. It has been represented by Myles Laroda from the Progressive Liberal Party since 2021.

== History ==
In the 2007 Bahamian general election, Byron Woodside was declared winner in the Pinewood election court recount against Allyson Maynard Gibson by 49 votes.

== Geography ==
The constituency comprises the Pinewood area of Nassau, the capital and largest city of the Bahamas.

== Members of Parliament ==
Election	Parliament	Candidate	Party
2002	10th Bahamian Parliament	Allyson Maynard Gibson	Progressive Liberal Party
2007	11th Bahamian Parliament	Byron Woodside	Free National Movement
2012	12th Bahamian Parliament	Khaalis Rolle	Progressive Liberal Party
2017	13th Bahamian Parliament	Reuben Rahming	Free National Movement
2021	14th Bahamian Parliament	Myles Laroda	Progressive Liberal Party
2026	15th Bahamian Parliament	Myles Laroda	Progressive Liberal Party

== Election results ==
2021
Party	Candidate	Votes	%	±%
PLP	Myles Laroda	1,712	51.21	▲13.21
FNM	Reuben Rahming	937	28.03	▼23.97
COI	Lincoln Bain	641	19.17	
DNA	Steven Nesbitt	53	1.59	▼7.41
Turnout		3,343	62.21	
PLP gain from FNM				

== See also ==
- Constituencies of the Bahamas
