= Robert MacAndrew =

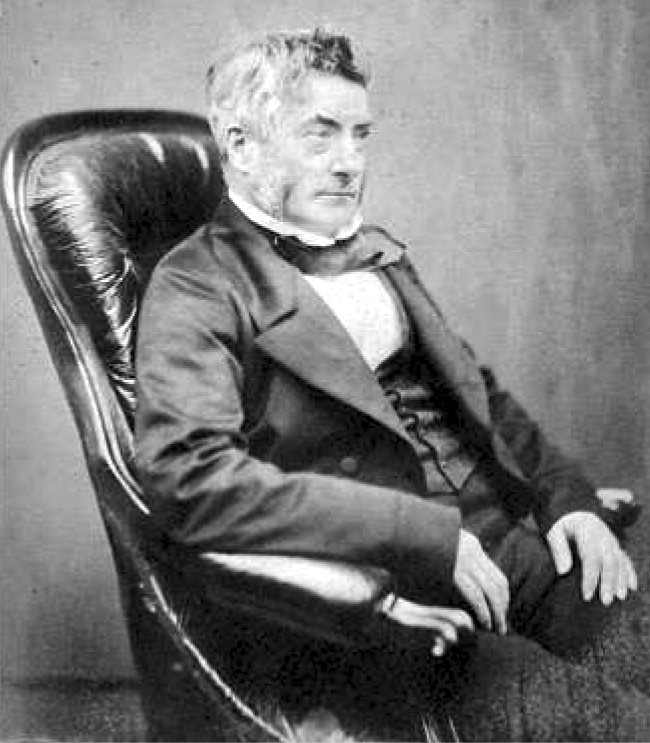
- Born: 22 March 1802; Wandsworth, London
- Died: 22 May 1873 (aged 71); Isleworth, Middlesex
- Occupations: Merchant, ship-owner
- Known for: Natural history of molluscs

Robert MacAndrew (22 March 1802 in Wandsworth, London – 22 May 1873 in Isleworth, Middlesex) was a British merchant and ship-owner, marine dredger, Fellow of the Royal Society, naturalist and collector of shells.

== Early life ==
Robert MacAndrew was one of eight sons of the fruit and shipping merchant, William McAndrew, from the Scottish city of Elgin, who had opened offices in Liverpool and London around 1770. Shortly after leaving school and his father's death in 1819, MacAndrew joined his brother, William Peter, in his fruit importing business of William McAndrew & Sons in London and Liverpool. Later, Robert concentrated on ship-owning through the business McAndrew & Co in London, whilst his brother founded a Liverpool-based company with his business partner John Cunningham. After the death of his brother, Robert relocated to Liverpool. There he married his cousin, Eliza, in 1829 and they had eleven children.

== Dredging and shell collection ==
In 1834, MacAndrew joined the Literary and Philosophical Society of Liverpool, where he met other naturalists. During the early 1830s his interest in natural history, especially shells, and he began to amass a collection. His many business trips to Spain, Portugal and the Mediterranean led to his interest in the collection of shells from the sea shore, and MacAndrew subsequently undertook a series of research trips dredging for shells around the coast of Britain and Ireland, Spain, Portugal, Madeira, the Canary Islands, Norway and finally to the Red Sea at the Gulf of Suez.

MacAndrew met Edward Forbes, one of the founders of deep-sea marine biology research and through Forbes, MacAndrew met other naturalists who were interested in dredging, who worked for the British Association for the Advancement of Science, including John Goodsir FRS (1814–1867), James Smith FRS ("of Jordanhill") (1782–1867), and the foremost conchologist of his day, John Gwyn Jeffreys FRS (1809–1885).

== Membership of learned societies ==
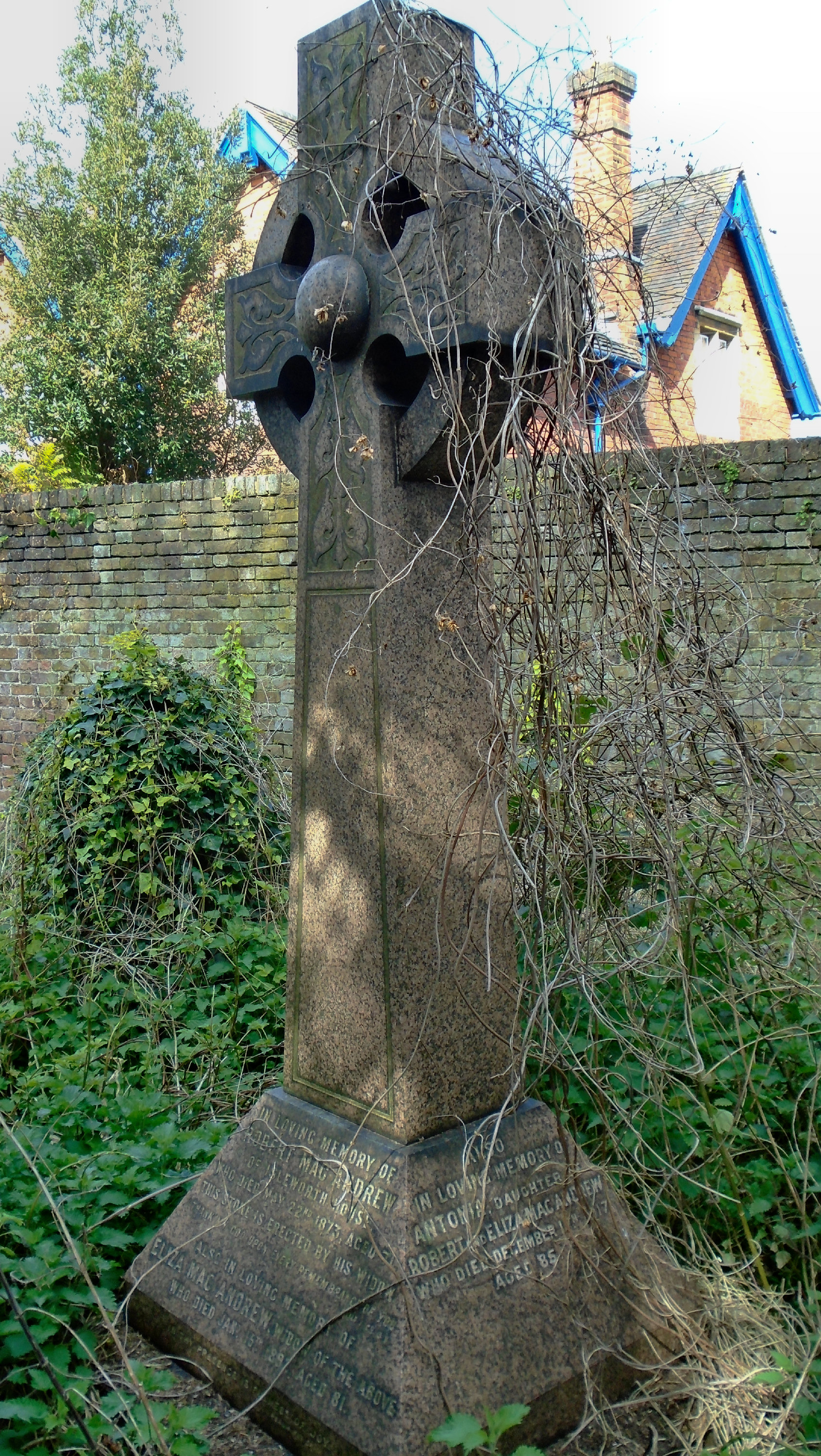
Isleworth, All Saints churchyard

He was elected Fellow of the Linnean Society of London on 6 April 1847. He was elected fellow of the Royal Society on 2 June 1853. From 1856 to 1857 he was President of the Literary and Philosophical Society of Liverpool. In 1858 MacAndrew was elected chairman of the newly formed General Dredging Committee, which he held for two years until he was replaced in 1861 by John Gwyn Jeffreys. In 1867, MacAndrew retired from his business interests. In 1872, together with Arturo Issel (1842–1922), he was awarded the 'Prix Savigny' of the French Academy of Sciences for his work on Testaceous Mollusca of the Gulf of Suez.

== Donation of collections to Cambridge University ==
The bulk of the current mollusc collection at Cambridge University Museum of Zoology was collected by MacAndrew who donated it to Cambridge University along with his library in 1873. The MacAndrew Collection contains tens of thousands of specimens, the bulk of which were collected by MacAndrew on his many dredging expeditions. The museum mollusc collection is available as an online searchable database through the museum website. Further specimens were donated to the National Museums of Scotland.

== Publications ==
- An Account of Some Zoological Researches, Made in the British Seas, during the Last Summer. In: Proceedings of the Literary and Philosophical Society of Liverpool. Volume 1, Number 1, 1845, pp. 89–96 (online).
- On Marine Dredging, with Notes and Observations, the result of personal experience during the Summers of 1846 and the 1847th. In: Proceedings of the Literary and Philosophical Society of Liverpool. Volume 1, Number 4, 1848, pp. 80–89 (online).
- On the Geographical Distribution of Testaceous Mollusca in the North-East Atlantic and Neighbouring Seas. In: Proceedings of the Literary and Philosophical Society of Liverpool. Volume 1, Number 8, 1853, pp. 8–56 (online).
- Notes on a dredging excursion to the North Cape. In: Proceedings of the Literary and Philosophical Society of Liverpool. Volume 1, Number 10, 1856, pp. 51–66 (online).
- Report of the Dredging Committee for the 1844th.In: Report of the meeting of the fourteenth British Association for the Advancement of Science. Part 1, London 1845, pp. 390–391. (online) With Edward Forbes.
- Notes on the Distribution and Range in depth of Mollusca and Other Marine Animals Observed on the Coasts of Spain, Portugal, Barbary, Malta, and Southern Italy in 1849. In: Report of the twentieth meeting of the British Association for the Advancement of Science. Part 1, London, 1851, pp. 264–304 (online).
- Notices of new or rare British animals observed during cruises in 1845 and 1846. In: Annals and Magazine of Natural History. Volume 19, 1847, pp. 96–98 (online). With Edward Forbes
- Notices of new or rare British animals observed during cruises in 1845 and 1846. In: Annals and Magazine of Natural History. Volume 19, 1847, pp. 390–392 (online). With Edward Forbes
- List of the Mollusca observed between Trondheim and the North Cape. In: Annals and Magazine of Natural History. Second Consequence, Volume 17, 1856, pp. 378–386 (online). With L. Barrett
- List of the Echinodermata dredged between Trondheim and the North Cape. In: Annals and Magazine of Natural History. Second Consequence, Volume 20, 1857, pp. 43–46. (online) With L. Barrett
- On the distribution of the Mollusca in depth on the coasts of Nordland and Finmark. In: Annals and Magazine of Natural History. Second Consequence, Volume 20, 1857, pp. 267–272 (online). With L. Barrett
- Note on the comparative size of marine Mollusca in various latitudes of the European Seas. In: Annals and Magazine of Natural History. Third Consequence, Volume 5, 1860, pp. 116–119 (online).
- Reply to Mr. Jeffrey's remarks on a note on the comparative size of marine Mollusca in various latitudes of the British Seas. In: Annals and Magazine of Natural History. Third Consequence, Volume 5, 1860, pp. 311–316 (online).
- On the division of the European Seas into Provinces, with reference to the distribution of Mollusca. In: Annals and Magazine of Natural History. Third Consequence, Volume 8, 1861, pp. 433–437 (online).
- Remarks upon Mr. J. Gwyn Jeffreys's last dredging report. In: Annals and Magazine of Natural History. 4th Consequence, Volume 2, 1868, pp. 357–362 (online).
- Report on the Mollusca Testaceous Obtained during a dredging-excursion in the Gulf of Suez in the months of February and March 1869. In: Annals and Magazine of Natural History. 4th Consequence, volume 6, 1870, pp. 429–450 (online).
