= Nassau Village (Bahamas Parliament constituency) =

Bahamas parliamentary constituency

- Constituency
- Nassau Village is 12 on this map of the 2021 election
- District: New Providence
- Electorate: 4,302 (2011); 5,702 (2021)

Current constituency
- Created: 2012
- Seats: 1
- Party: Progressive Liberal Party
- Member: Jamahl Strachan

Nassau Village is a parliamentary constituency represented in the House of Assembly of the Bahamas. It elects one member of parliament (MP) using the first past the post electoral system. It has been represented by Jamahl Strachan from the Progressive Liberal Party since 2021.

== Geography ==
The constituency comprises the Nassau Village area of Nassau, the capital and largest city of the Bahamas.

== Members of Parliament ==
Election	Parliament	Candidate	Party
2012	12th Bahamian Parliament	Dion Smith	Progressive Liberal Party
2017	13th Bahamian Parliament	Halson Moultrie	Free National Movement
2021	14th Bahamian Parliament	Jamahl Strachan	Progressive Liberal Party

== Election results ==
2021
Party	Candidate	Votes	%	±%
PLP	Jamahl Strachan	2,075	57.99	▲22.99
FNM	Nicole Martin	1,016	28.40	▼27.60
COI	Jason Gibson	324	9.06	
United Coalition Movement	Dewitt Moultrie	83	2.32	
DNA	Zerline Ferguson	46	1.29	▼6.71
Independent	Mario Woodside	34	0.95	
Turnout		3,578	62.75	
PLP gain from FNM				

== See also ==
- Constituencies of the Bahamas
