= Basil McIntosh =

Bahamian politician

Member of the Parliament of the Bahamas for Mayaguana, Inagua, Crooked Island, Acklins and Long Cay
- In office 23 September 2021 – 8 April 2026
- Preceded by: Miriam Emmanuel
- Succeeded by: J. Leo Ferguson

Personal details
- Party: Progressive Liberal Party

Basil Walton McIntosh is a Bahamian politician from the Progressive Liberal Party.

== Career ==
In the 2021 Bahamian general election, he was elected in MICAL constituency. He served as Minister of State for the Environment under Prime Minister Philip "Brave" Davis.

In 2024 he said he intended to stand in the 2026 Bahamian general election. In June 2025, he said he would not seek re-election.

== See also ==
- 14th Bahamian Parliament
