= MICAL (Bahamas Parliament constituency) =

Bahamas parliamentary constituency

- Constituency
- The Bahamas constituencies in 2021
- District: Multiple
- Major settlements: Abraham's Bay, Colonel Hill, Matthew Town, Pirates Well, Spring Point

Current constituency
- Seats: 1
- Party: Free National Movement
- Member: J. Leo Ferguson

Mayaguana, Inagua, Crooked Island, Acklins and Long Cay, abbreviated as MICAL, is a parliamentary constituency represented in the House of Assembly of the Bahamas.

== Geography ==
The constituency name is an acronym of the five islands it contains that form the south-eastern tip of the Bahamas: Mayaguana, Inagua, Crooked Island, Acklins, and Long Cay. The constituency is geographically large and rural.

== Members of Parliament ==
Election	Parliament	Candidate	Party	Ref.
1997	9th Bahamian Parliament	Vernon Symonette	FNM	
2002	10th Bahamian Parliament	V. Alfred Gray	PLP	
2007	11th Bahamian Parliament	V. Alfred Gray	PLP	
2012	12th Bahamian Parliament	V. Alfred Gray	PLP	
2017	13th Bahamian Parliament	Miriam Emmanuel	FNM	
2021	14th Bahamian Parliament	Basil McIntosh	PLP	
2026	15th Bahamian Parliament	J. Leo Ferguson	FNM	

== Elections ==
=== 2026 general election ===
Basil McIntosh has said he will not seek re-election at the 2026 general election.

In April 2025, former Golden Gates MP and Cabinet minister Shane Gibson said he planned to seek the Progressive Liberal Party nomination in MICAL. In January 2026, Robert Dupuch-Carron withdrew his application for the PLP nomination, and Ronnell Armbrister emerged as the front-runner. The PLP ratified Armbrister as its candidate later that month.

In August 2025, J. Leo Ferguson was tapped as the Free National Movement candidate for MICAL.

=== Past elections ===
2021
Party	Candidate	Votes	%	±%
PLP	Basil McIntosh	630	62.81	▲14.81
FNM	Miriam Emmanuel	355	35.39	▼16.61
COI	Philan Bowe Sr.	15	1.50	
Grand Commonwealth Party	Pearl Pratt	3	0.30	
Turnout		1,003	72.05	
PLP gain from FNM				

== See also ==
- List of National Assembly constituencies of The Bahamas
