= Myles Laroda =

Bahamian politician

Member of the Parliament of the Bahamas for Pinewood
- Incumbent
- Assumed office 2021

Personal details
- Party: Progressive Liberal Party

Myles Laroda is a Bahamian politician from the Progressive Liberal Party.

== Career ==
In the 2021 Bahamian general election, he was elected in Pinewood.

From 2021 to 2024, he was Minister of State in the Office of the Prime Minister.

== See also ==
- 14th Bahamian Parliament
