= Mario Bowleg =

Bahamian politician

Mario Bowleg M.P.

Minister of Youth and Sports
- Incumbent
- Assumed office 16 May 2026
- Prime Minister: Philip "Brave" Davis

Minister of Youth, Sports and Culture
- In office 23 September 2021 – 16 May 2026
- Prime Minister: Philip "Brave" Davis
- Preceded by: Iram Lewis

Member of Parliament for Garden Hills
- Incumbent
- Assumed office 16 September 2021
- Preceded by: Brensil Rolle

Personal details
- Born: Mario Keith Bowleg Bahamas
- Party: Progressive Liberal Party
- Spouse: Diana Bowleg

Mario Keith Bowleg is a Bahamian politician and former basketball coach and sports administrator who has served as Minister of Youth and Sports since 2026 and member of parliament (MP) for Garden Hills since 2021. He previously served as Minister of Youth, Sports and Culture from 2021 to 2026. He is a member of the Progressive Liberal Party (PLP), and previously spent more than two decades working in banking and held senior roles in Bahamian basketball, including president of the Bahamas Basketball Federation and head coach of the men's national team.

== Early life and non-political career ==
Bowleg was born in the Bahamas.

=== Banking career ===
Bowleg began his banking career as a security guard and doorman at Commonwealth Bank and later became an assistant branch manager there. During the 2021 general election campaign he was described in local media as "a banker by profession and well-known basketball coach".

=== Basketball coaching and administration ===
Bowleg played basketball in his youth and later became a coach at several levels. Bahamas Olympic Committee president Romell Knowles has described him as a former player with the AF Adderley "Fighting Tigers" who went on to coach boys' high school teams at St Andrew's School (the Hurricanes) and C. C. Sweeting Senior High School (the Cobras), before progressing to assistant and head coach roles with the Bahamas men's national team.

By 2014 he was first vice-president of the Bahamas Basketball Federation (BBF). In September 2014 the BBF named him head coach of the Bahamas men's national basketball team, replacing Larry Eustachy. Bowleg had previously served as Eustachy's assistant at regional tournaments in Tortola and Mexico. He was elected president of the BBF in spring 2018. In an interview with FIBA, Bowleg outlined five main pillars for his presidency: developing and training executives and administrators, improving training and recertification for officials and coaches, re-establishing youth development programmes and restoring women's basketball across the country. He has said that he views basketball not only as a sport but as a "tool that builds character" and can help keep young people away from crime.

== Political career ==
=== Member of Parliament ===
Bowleg entered elective politics with the Progressive Liberal Party (PLP). In early 2021 the PLP announced him as its candidate for the Garden Hills constituency in New Providence for the 14th Bahamian Parliament. At the general election, held on 16 September 2021, Bowleg won the seat for the PLP, defeating the Free National Movement (FNM) candidate, businessman Stephen Greenslade.

Bowleg was re-elected in Garden Hills at the 2026 Bahamian general election, defeating FNM candidate and former NBA player Rick Fox. Fox's candidacy drew international attention during the campaign, but The Tribune described his bid for Parliament as having "collapsed" in Garden Hills.

=== Ministerial offices ===
After the PLP's victory in 2021, Prime Minister Philip "Brave" Davis appointed Bowleg as Minister of Youth, Sports and Culture in September 2021. At the time of his appointment, Bahamian sports coverage highlighted his experience as a coach, Bahamas Basketball Federation president and former Bahamas Olympic Committee vice-president. His first ministerial portfolio covered three broad policy areas: youth development, national sports strategy, and the governance and support of cultural institutions, particularly Junkanoo.

Following the PLP's re-election in 2026, Bowleg was sworn in as Minister of Youth and Sports in Davis's second administration. The new Cabinet separated culture from his portfolio, with Leslia Miller-Brice appointed Minister of Culture, Arts and Heritage.

==== Youth programmes ====
As minister, Bowleg relaunched and expanded several national youth initiatives. In February 2022 he restarted the government's "Fresh Start" programme in Grand Bahama after its suspension during the COVID-19 pandemic. The programme provides unemployed young people with a 16-week curriculum combining soft-skills training, technical instruction and supervised work placements, with the goal of improving employability and preparing participants for entry-level jobs.

The ministry also expanded the "Youth Leaders Certification Programme", which trains and certifies adult community leaders who work with youth groups across the country. In October 2025 the ministry inaugurated the "Youth Leaders' Hall of Excellence" to recognise long-serving youth leaders for their contributions to community development. Bowleg also presides over annual observances such as Youth Month and Youth in Parliament, which form part of the ministry's civic-education and youth-engagement agenda.

==== Sports policy ====
Shortly after taking office, Bowleg outlined priorities including the rehabilitation of key national facilities, expansion of sports tourism under the "Sports in Paradise" concept, and support for pathways enabling Bahamian athletes to compete internationally.

Under his oversight, The Bahamas hosted the 50th CARIFTA Games in 2023 and revived the multi-sport "Bahamas Games" as the Golden Jubilee Games during the nation's 50th anniversary of independence. He has also supported individual sport development projects, including the launch of a government-supported national boxing academy in Nassau in 2025.

==== Cultural policy ====
In cultural affairs, Bowleg oversaw support for the national Junkanoo parades and related cultural institutions during his tenure as Minister of Youth, Sports and Culture. The ministry increased financial subventions to Junkanoo groups and expanded partnerships with private-sector sponsors to support parade operations. He has promoted cultural tourism initiatives, including official visits to the Educulture Junkanoo Museum and support for community-based cultural programmes.

Beginning in 2023, Bowleg led a reform process to change the governance of Junkanoo. In 2025 the government transferred management of the major Boxing Day and New Year's Day parades from the long-standing Junkanoo Corporation of New Providence (JCNP) to a newly established statutory body, the "National Junkanoo Committee" (NJC), following consultations with Junkanoo groups. The ministry also launched a national consultation on a draft Junkanoo Bill intended to formalise oversight and funding arrangements for the parades.

As part of these reforms, Bowleg announced a full audit of the JCNP and stated that no private parades competing with the national events would be approved by the government. The restructuring attracted criticism from some Junkanoo leaders and media commentators, who questioned the extent of ministerial control, while government statements described the changes as intended to strengthen accountability and ensure sustainable public funding.

== Honours and recognition ==
In October 2023 the Diamond Eagle Foundation, a Grand Bahama–based youth organisation, honoured Bowleg as one of ten men recognised for their contributions to youth development, citing his decades of work with young people as a basketball coach and later as minister.

He has also served as patron for the Youth Leaders' Hall of Excellence and other ministry youth awards programmes.

== Personal life ==
He is married to Diana Bowleg.

Outside of politics, Bowleg has been associated with youth mentoring and community sports programmes in Garden Hills and elsewhere in New Providence, and appears at church services and civic events as Minister of Youth, Sports and Culture.
