= J. Leo Ferguson =

Bahamian politician

James Leo Ferguson

Member of Parliament for MICAL
- Incumbent
- Assumed office 12 May 2026
- Preceded by: Basil McIntosh

Personal details
- Party: Free National Movement

James Leo Ferguson is a Bahamian politician from the Free National Movement (FNM). He was elected member of the House of Assembly for MICAL in 2026.

His father Senator Johnlee Ferguson, contested the same seat in 2002. Ferguson was Assistant Superintendent of Police.

== See also ==
- 15th Bahamian Parliament
