= Marathon (Bahamas Parliament constituency) =

Bahamas parliamentary constituency

- Constituency
- Marathon is 20 on this map of the 2021 election
- District: New Providence
- Electorate: 4,034 (2011); 5,368 (2021)

Current constituency
- Seats: 1
- Party: Progressive Liberal Party
- Member: Lisa Rahming

Marathon is a parliamentary constituency represented in the House of Assembly of the Bahamas. It elects one member of parliament (MP) using the first past the post electoral system. It has been represented by Lisa Rahming from the Progressive Liberal Party since 2021.

== Geography ==
The constituency comprises the inner city Marathon Road area of Nassau, the capital and largest city of the Bahamas.

== Members of Parliament ==
Election	Parliament	Candidate	Party
1992	8th Bahamian Parliament	Arlington Butler	Free National Movement
1997	9th Bahamian Parliament	Algernon Allen	Free National Movement
2002	10th Bahamian Parliament	Ron Pinder	Progressive Liberal Party
2007	11th Bahamian Parliament	Earl Deveaux	Free National Movement
2012	12th Bahamian Parliament	Jerome Fitzgerald	Progressive Liberal Party
2017	13th Bahamian Parliament	Romauld Ferreira	Free National Movement
2021	14th Bahamian Parliament	Lisa Rahming	Progressive Liberal Party
2026	15th Bahamian Parliament	Lisa Rahming	Progressive Liberal Party

== Election results ==
2021
Party	Candidate	Votes	%	±%
PLP	Lisa Rahming	2,050	62.63	▲19.63
FNM	Romauld Ferreira	884	27.01	▼22.99
COI	Shantiqua Cleare	264	8.07	
United Coalition Movement	Raquel Horton	21	0.64	
DNA	Zacchaeus Glass	20	0.61	▼3.39
Bahamas Constitution Party	Brian Mchardy	20	0.61	
Grand Commonwealth Party	Stella Thompson	14	0.43	
Turnout		3,273	60.97	
PLP gain from FNM				

== See also ==
- Constituencies of the Bahamas
