= Tall Pines (Bahamas Parliament constituency) =

Bahamas parliamentary constituency

Tall Pines (Formerly Blue Hills before 2007)
- Constituency
- Tall Pines is 4 on this map of the 2021 election
- District: New Providence
- Electorate: 4,010 (2011); 6,243 (2021)

Current constituency
- Created: 2012
- Seats: 1
- Party: Progressive Liberal Party
- Member: Michael Darville

Tall Pines is a parliamentary constituency represented in the House of Assembly of the Bahamas. It elects one member of parliament (MP) using the first past the post electoral system. It has been represented by Michael Darville from the Progressive Liberal Party since 2021.

== Geography ==
The constituency comprises an area in the west of the city of Nassau, the capital and largest city of the Bahamas.

== Members of Parliament ==
Election	Parliament	Candidate	Party
1997	9th Bahamian Parliament	Dion Foulkes	Free National Movement
2002	10th Bahamian Parliament	Leslie Miller	Progressive Liberal Party
2007	11th Bahamian Parliament	Dion Foulkes	Free National Movement
2012	12th Bahamian Parliament	Leslie Miller	Progressive Liberal Party
2017	13th Bahamian Parliament	Donald Saunders	Free National Movement
2021	14th Bahamian Parliament	Michael Darville	Progressive Liberal Party
2026	15th Bahamian Parliament	Dr Michael Darville	Progressive Liberal Party

== Election results ==
2021
Party	Candidate	Votes	%	±%
PLP	Michael Darville	2,243	57.93	▲9.93
FNM	Donald Saunders	1,107	28.59	▼24.41
COI	Kendal Richardson	378	9.76	
DNA	Theophilus J. Coakley	82	2.12	▼1.88
United Coalition Movement	Philippa Lundy	62	1.60	
Turnout		3,872	62.02	
PLP gain from FNM				

== See also ==
- Constituencies of the Bahamas
