= Kingsley Smith (politician) =

Bahamian politician

Member of the Parliament of the Bahamas for West Grand Bahama and Bimini
- Incumbent
- Assumed office 6 December 2023
- Preceded by: Obie Wilchcombe

Personal details
- Party: Progressive Liberal Party

Kingsley Smith is a Bahamian politician from the Progressive Liberal Party.

== Career ==
In the 2023 by-election, he was elected in West Grand Bahama and Bimini. He defeated Free National Movement (FNM) candidate Ricardo Grant.

The by-election was triggered by the death of Obie Wilchcombe.

== See also ==
- 14th Bahamian Parliament
