= Lisa Rahming =

Bahamian politician

Hon. Lisa Rahming MP

Minister of State for Social Services and Urban Development
- Incumbent
- Assumed office 23 September 2021
- Prime Minister: Philip "Brave" Davis

Member of Parliament for Marathon
- Incumbent
- Assumed office 6 October 2021
- Preceded by: Romi Ferreira
- Majority: 1,166 (35.62%)

Personal details
- Born: Lisa Tammy Rahming
- Party: Progressive Liberal Party
- Education: University of the Bahamas

Lisa Tammy Rahming is a Bahamian Progressive Liberal Party politician, and attorney who has been serving as the Bahamian Minister of State for Social Services and Urban Development since 23 September 2021 and the Member of Parliament from Marathon since 6 October 2021. Rahming defeated FNM incumbent Romi Ferreira in the 2021 general election.
