= Pleasant Bridgewater =

Bahamian politician

Pleasant M. M. Bridgewater (born 26 September 1960 in Freeport, Grand Bahama) is a Bahamian politician who served as Senator and Member of The House of Assembly for the Progressive Liberal Party (PLP) of The Bahamas. She was the first Northern Bahamas woman to contest and serve in The Bahamas Parliament. She contested and was defeated in the 1992 general elections (High Rock constituency) and in September of that year was appointed and served in the Senate from 1992 to 1997 under the administration of Sir Lynden Pindling. In 1997, she again contested in the general elections (High Rock constituency) and was defeated. From 2002 to 2007 she was the PLP Member of Parliament representing the Marco City constituency. Following her defeat in the 2007 general election, she was again appointed to the Senate. In 2009, Bridgewater resigned from that position in order to fight extortion allegations relating to the premature death of John Travolta's autistic son.

Bridgewater is also the senior partner of the Freeport-based law firm Bridgewater and Co., which she founded in 1997. She was called to the Bahamas Bar in 1992.
