= Charles A. Hepburn =

British businessman (1891–1971)

- Born: 1891
- Died: July 1971 (aged 79–80)
- Occupation: Businessman

Charles A. Hepburn (16 Feb 1891 – 16 July 1971) was a Scottish businessman, a joint founder, along with Herbert Ross, of the Hepburn and Ross whisky blending company, which was the first to blend the popular Red Hackle whisky (blended today by Lang Brothers). The prosperity that Hepburn and Ross' enterprise brought Charles Hepburn allowed him to become a well known Glasgow patron of the arts, with him amassing a large collection of literature and books in particular. He also collected various paintings, furniture, arms and armour, as well as oriental rugs.

He became a benefactor to the University of Glasgow, for which he was given an honorary doctorate in law in 1964. He was also involved with the Glasgow Zoo (as was his colleague Herbert Ross), of which he became president. He is widely credited for reviving the fortunes of the zoo in the late 1950s and early 1960s by renovating it and donating some of his own money to this end.

Hepburn died on 16 July 1971. He bequeathed to Glasgow University a large number of books and manuscripts, some 300 in total, which are now held there as the Hepburn Bequest. He also left a house to the university, which is now known as Hepburn House, and fittingly, given Hepburn's commitment to the arts, houses the university's History of Art Department.
