= Long Cay =

Island in Crooked Island and Long Cay District, Bahamas

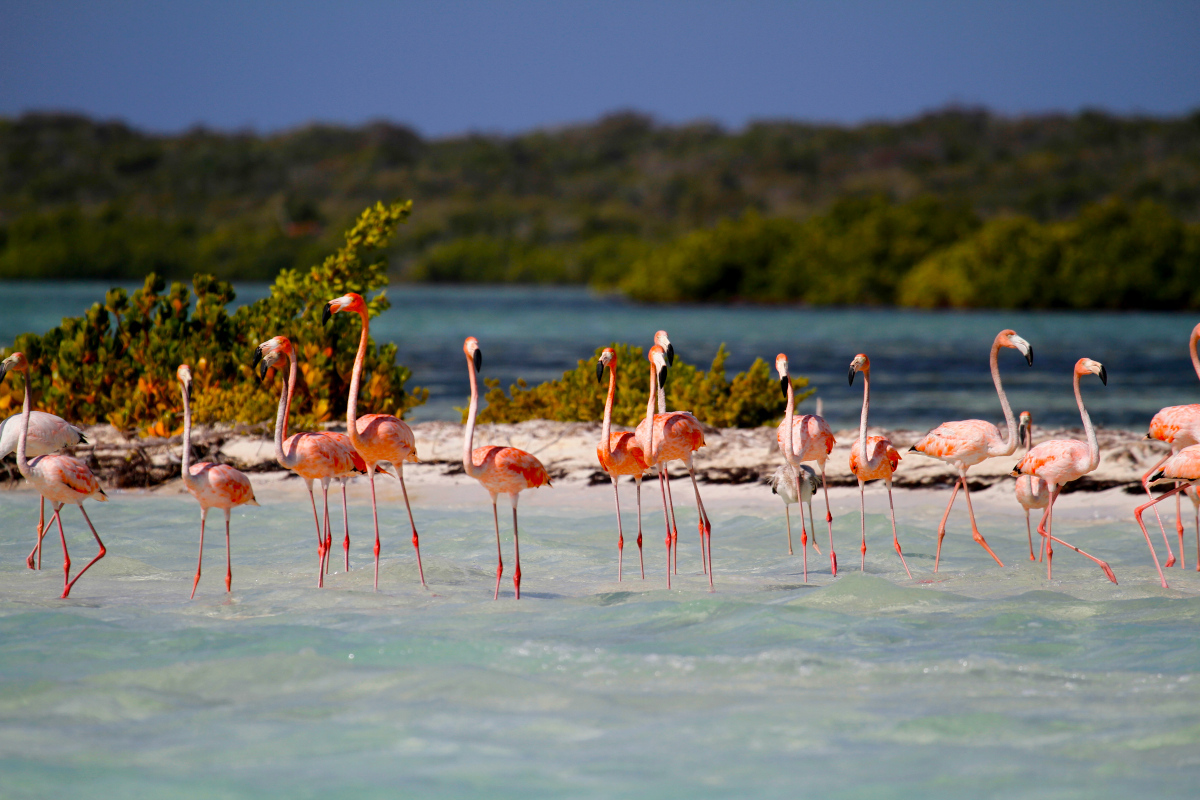
American flamingos on Long Cay

Long Cay (formerly known as Fortune Island; Portuguese: Caio Longo; Spanish: Cayo Largo; French: Île de la Fortune) is an 8-square-mile (21 km^{2}) island in the Bahamas in an atoll that includes Acklins Island and Crooked Island. Since 1999, it has also been one of the Third Schedule districts of The Bahamas. As of 2010, its population was 29. Coordinates = 2235 North and 7422 West.

== Geography ==
from the air

Long Cay lies to the west of a shallow lagoon called the Bight of Acklins and is an extension of the western arm of Crooked Island, separated from it by a channel about one mile wide. The main town is Albert Town, now largely a ghost town. Douglas Town was another former settlement only about 500 meters from Albert Town. Great Salt Pond lies in the middle of the island. The southernmost point is known as Windsor Point, called Cabo Hermoso by Christopher Columbus.

== History ==
On 19 October 1492, Long Cay was encountered by Columbus on his first voyage to the New World, and he named it Isabela.

Albert Town became a port in the sponge and salt industries and a port of call for the Hamburg America Line and the Pacific Mail Steamship Company to recruit stevedore labour.

The grandfather of W. E. B. Du Bois was born on Long Cay in 1803.

== Politics ==
The island is part of the MICAL constituency for elections to the House of Assembly of the Bahamas.
