= James Hepburn (ornithologist) =

James Edward Hepburn (London c. 1811 – Victoria, British Columbia, April 16, 1869) was an ornithologist.

James Hepburn was born in London in 1810 or 1811, the eldest son of James Hepburn of Tovil Place, Maidstone. Educated at Trinity College, Cambridge and at the Inner Temple, he was called to the bar in 1842, before emigrating to America.

Living in San Francisco, then Victoria, he made collections of natural history specimens, including birds of the North Pacific. His notebook catalogue contains 1436 entries, with some numbers representing several specimens. One notebook has the appearance of being prepared as preliminary to a book on western American birds. Hepburn's notebooks and catalogues are in the Cambridge University Museum of Zoology, A few skins went to the Smithsonian Institution.

He is quoted at some length in Baird, Brewer, and Ridgway's A History of North American Birds (1874). It seem likely that his notebook was in the hands of one of the authors. His only published contribution was in the journal Ibis in the same volume that contains a notice of his death.

Recognised as a collector and observer, Hepburn is honoured by having a subspecies of the grey-crowned rosy finch named after him as Hepburn's rosy-finch (Leucosticte tephrocotis littoralis).

On April 16, 1869, Hepburn died suddenly at Victoria, Vancouver Island. Although not mentioned in his will, his relations presented his zoological collections to the University Museum of Zoology, Cambridge in October, 1870.
