= Sport in the Bahamas =

The most popular sports in the Bahamas are those of colonial British origin as well as those adopted from neighbouring United States. They include athletics, basketball, baseball, American football, swimming, softball, tennis, boxing, and volleyball track. In addition, Rugby union, rugby league, rugby sevens, golf, beach soccer, and lacrosse are also considered growing sports in the Bahamas. Basketball is the most popular sport in the Bahamas.

== Athletics ==
The governing body for athletics track and field is the Bahamas Association of Athletic Associations.

In 70 years, the Bahamas has won 14 Olympic medals at the Olympics, 25 medals at the IAAF World Championships in Athletics, and numerous medals at the Pan American Games and the Commonwealth Games in Athletics alone.

Thomas A Robinson National Stadium and Old Thomas A Robinson National Stadiums are the first two certified tracks in the country. Other tracks in the country are Grand Bahama Sports Complex on Grand Bahama that has a World Athletics certified track and "Carl Oliver Track And Field Stadium" on North Andros.

The nation has hosted CARIFTA Games a total of eight times. They also hosted the 2005 Central American and Caribbean Championships in Athletics the 2017 Commonwealth Youth Games and the first three editions of the World Athletics Relays.

== Basketball ==
Basketball is governed by the Bahamas Basketball Federation

Mychal Thompson was the first Bahamian drafted into the NBA. Dexter Cambridge, Rick Fox, Ian Lockhart, Magnum Rolle, Buddy Hield, Deandre Ayton, V.J. Edgecombe and Kai Jones has since gone on to play in the NBA, with Ayton landing the first overall pick in the 2018 NBA draft.

The men's, women's and junior level national teams have won many international tournaments in its history. The men's team placed eighth at the 1995 Tournament of the Americas and won the FIBA CBC Championship a total of seven times. This makes them the most dominant country in CBC tournament history.

There is an annual tournament that takes place at the Atlantis Resort Paradise island, showcasing NCAA American-based athletes called Battle 4 Atlantis.

"The Hoopfest in Paradise" is a tournament that will take place December 16–17, 2022, at the Kendal Isaacs Gymnasium annually showcasing high school teams from both New Providence and Grand Bahama who will compete against American-based ranked schools.

There are numerous gymnasiums used for basketball in the country with the biggest one being The Kendal G. L. Isaacs National Gymnasium in Nassau.

== Bat and ball games ==
=== Baseball ===
Baseball in the Bahamas is governed by the Bahamas Baseball Federation.

Seven baseball players from the Bahamas has played in Major League Baseball between 1957 and 2022, and a total of 25 currently play in the Minor league system as of 2022.

Andre Rodgers was the first Bahamian to play in the MLB. The other Bahamians who have played in MLB are Ed Armbrister, Tony Curry, Wenty Ford, Wil Culmer, Antoan Richardson, Jazz Chisholm Jr. and Lucius Fox.

There is an annual tournament called "Don’t Blink Home Run Derby".

Baseball is played at the Andre Rodgers Baseball Stadium which is part of the Queen Elizabeth Sports Center.

=== Softball ===
Bahamas Softball Federation governs softball in the country.

The sport has been played in the Bahamas since the 1940s.

There are several leagues across the nation, mainly in Nassau and Freeport. In 2022 the University of the Bahamas women's softball team competed in Florida.

=== Cricket ===
Bahamas Cricket Association governs the sport in the Bahamas. Cricket is no longer the national sport of the Bahamas. It was the national sport of the Bahamas until 2023, although it was long debated to be changed among the majority of locals, due to the decline in popularity of the sport.

Haynes Oval and Windsor Park are to the two main cricket grounds in Nassau, Bahamas, while the main and only cricket grounds on Grand Bahama is the Lucaya Cricket Oval.

== Football codes ==
=== American football ===
Bahamas American Football Federation governs American football in the country. They operate a number of junior and senior flag football Leagues for men and women.

Ed Smith is the first Bahamian to be drafted into the NFL. Devard Darling and Michael Strachan are other Bahamians who played in the NFL.

There is an annual tournament called Bahamas Bowl that features ranked NCAA football teams from the United States.

=== Association football ===
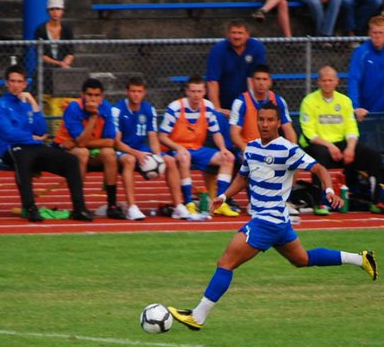
A football player from the Bahamas

The Bahamas Football Association is the governing body of association football in the Bahamas. Bahamas national football team has never qualified for Fifa World Cup

The national team plays at the Thomas A Robinson National Stadium. Domestic League matches are also played at the Freeport Rugby & Football Club on Grand Bahama.

BFA Senior League is the top division of the sport in the country.

=== Rugby sevens ===
U18 Bahamas National Sevens Team competed in the 2020 "Tropical Sevens" Tournament in Orlando, Florida.

=== Rugby union ===
Bahamas Rugby Football Union is the governing body of Rugby Union in the country. Bahamas national rugby union team has never qualified for the Rugby World Cup.

== Combat sports ==
=== Boxing ===
Boxing in The Bahamas includes both professional and amateur (Olympic-style) competition. Professional boxing is regulated by the Bahamas Boxing Commission. Olympic-style boxing is overseen by the Bahamas Boxing Federation, as listed by the Bahamas Olympic Committee.

Organised boxing promotion in Nassau expanded in the 1940s. In 1975, Everette "Elisha Obed" Ferguson became the first Bahamian to win a world boxing championship, capturing the WBC light middleweight title in Paris. Nassau has also hosted major international bouts, including Muhammad Ali's final professional fight (against Trevor Berbick) in December 1981.

The Bahamas first sent boxers to the 1972 Summer Olympics in Munich, and Bahamian fighters have also earned Commonwealth Games medals. Tureano Johnson is a notable Bahamian boxer that fought at the 2008 Olympic Games. He also won the WBC Silver middleweight title.

In the 2020s, the Bahamas World Boxing Federation was established; it later became a member of World Boxing. The Bahamas Boxing Academy, a private non-profit organisation, is developing a National Boxing Gym, envisioned as a centre combining training and competition with youth-support services.

=== Judo ===
Judo is governed by the Bahamas Judo Federation.

Darcy Rahming is the president while his son Darcy Rahming Jr is the Technical Director. Darcy Rahming Sr also has a daughter Cynthia Rahming who competes in Judo for the Bahamas.

Cynthia Rahming is ranked 145th place in the world as of February 2022.

Andrew Munnings of the Bahamas is ranked 234th in the world as of February 2022.

=== Mixed martial arts ===
The Bahamas Mixed Martial Arts Federation (BMMAF) is the governing body for mixed martial arts in the nation. They hope to become a part of the International Mixed Martial Arts Federation (IMMAF) in the near future.

Empire Mixed Martial Arts Bahamas is a Pan American member of the (IMMAF)

== Equestrian ==
Equestrian Bahamas is an organization that supports and promotes the sport of equestrian in the Bahamas. There is a growing interest amongst youth through their programs.

Millie Vlasov has been competing for the nation and took part in the "Andalucia Sunshine Tour" in Vejer de la Frontera, Spain. She is currently looking to qualify for the 2023 Central American and Caribbean Games.

== Golf ==
Golf is governed by Bahamas Golf Federation.

There are many golf tournaments in the Bahamas hosted annually including two on the Korn Ferry Tour: The Bahamas Great Abaco Classic and The Bahamas Great Exuma Classic.

== Lacrosse ==
The Bahamas has been hosting lacrosse events in Nassau and Grand Bahama in recent years.

== Netball ==
The Bahamas national netball team represented the Bahamas Netball Federation at the 1971 and 1979 World Netball Tournaments. They have also competed in the Caribbean Netball Championships. They hosted the 1977 tournament.

== Sailing ==
Sailing is a very popular sport in the Bahamas. It was announced as the new national sport in April 2023. The country got its first Olympic medals in sailing with Durward Knowles and Cecil Cooke.

Numerous regattas take place throughout the Bahamian Islands, with the biggest being the "National Family Island Regatta" in Exuma Island. The "Long Island Regatta" in Long Island, Bahamas, and Cat Island Regatta on Cat Island, Bahamas are also major events.

== Swimming ==
The Bahamas Aquatics Federation ('BAF') is the governing body in the country.

Arianna Vanderpool-Wallace is the first Bahamian to make an Olympic final at the 2012 Olympic Games.

This biggest swimming venue in the country is Betty Kelly-Kenning National Swim Complex in Nassau. There are numerous other swimming pools in high schools across Nassau.

On Grand Bahama there is an Olympic standard size swimming pool at Bishop Michael Eldon School and the YMCA.

The country has hosted CARIFTA Swimming Championships on four occasions.

== Tennis ==
Tennis is governed by the Bahamas Lawn Tennis Association.

Mark Knowles is the most notable tennis player from the Bahamas.

There is a National Tennis Center located in the Queens Elizebeth Sports Complex in Nassau.

== Volleyball ==
Bahamas Volleyball Federation Governs the sport volleyball in the country.

== Other ==
Emily Morley is the first Bahamian to compete at the 2016 Olympic Games in rowing.

== Stadiums in the Bahamas ==
Stadium	Country	Capacity	Image
Thomas Robinson Stadium	Bahamas	15,023	

== See also ==
- Bahamas at the Olympics
- Bahamas at the Commonwealth Games
- Bahamas at the Pan American Games
- Lists of stadiums
