= Darron Pickstock =

Bahamian lawyer and politician

Member of the Parliament of the Bahamas for Golden Isles
- Incumbent
- Assumed office 24 November 2025
- Preceded by: Vaughn Miller

Member of the Senate of the Bahamas
- In office 6 October 2021 – 28 October 2025

Personal details
- Born: Nassau, The Bahamas
- Party: Progressive Liberal
- Website: https://gsolegal.com/darron-s-pickstock/

Darron S. Pickstock is a Bahamian politician and lawyer from the Progressive Liberal Party. In 2021, he was appointed to the Senate of the Bahamas. He has also had a long career in law, working with Bahamian law firm Glinton Sweeting O’Brien (GSO), which specializes in offshore financial services.

== Early life and education ==
Pickstock earned a Bachelor of Laws from the University of Buckingham and took a Bar Vocational Course at the University of the West of England. He passed the Bahamas bar test and the United Kingdom Bar exam in 2006. Pickstock joined GSO in 2010, and was made partner in 2017.

== Political career ==
Pickstock was appointed to the Senate of the Bahamas in 2021 by Prime Minister Philip Davis as a constitutionally required opposition member of the Senate. He serves as the executive chairman of the Bahamas Agricultural and Industrial Corporation. Pickstock has been a critic of a new government housing project called Pinecrest, citing its vulnerability to flooding.

In the 2025 by-election he was elected to replace Vaughn Miller in the Golden Isles constituency. He resigned his seat in the senate before the by-election.
