= Cambridge University Museum of Zoology =

University Museum in Downing Street, Cambridge

Coordinates: 52.2033°N 0.1204°E

University Museum of Zoology, Cambridge
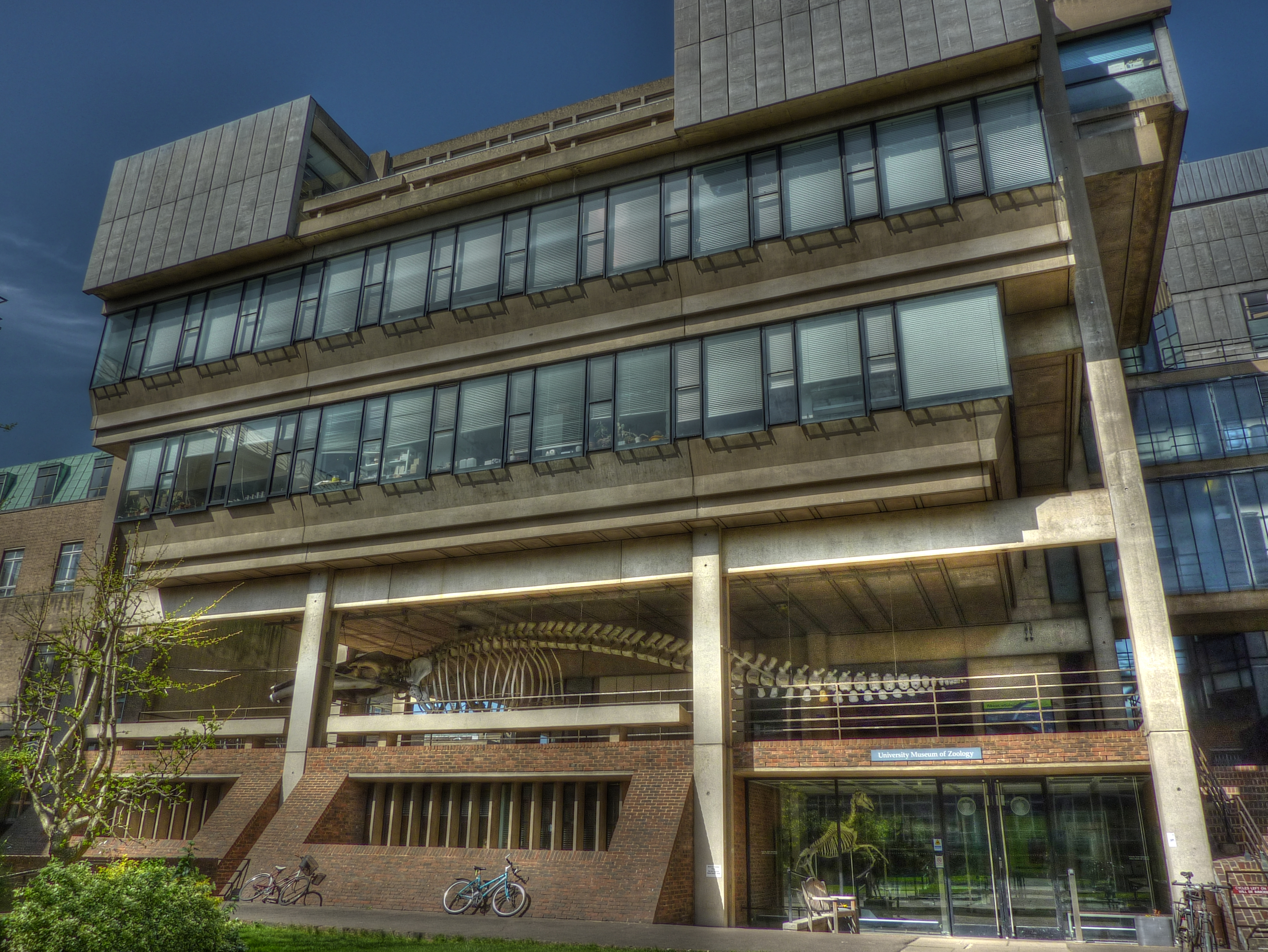
- Giant Finback whale at the Museum of Zoology
- Location: Museum of Zoology, Downing Street, Cambridge. CB2 3EJ
- Type: University Museum
- Accreditation: Arts Council England accredited
- Collections: Fossils, Vertebrates, Birds, Insects, Molluscs, Invertebrates
- Visitors: 103,604 (2022)
- Museum Manager: Jack Ashby
- Director: Professor Rebecca Kilner
- Owner: University of Cambridge

University of Cambridge Museums
- Fitzwilliam Museum; Kettle's Yard; Museum of Archaeology and Anthropology; Museum of Classical Archaeology; Whipple Museum of the History of Science; Sedgwick Museum of Earth Sciences; The Polar Museum; Museum of Zoology

The University Museum of Zoology is a museum of the University of Cambridge and part of the research community of the Department of Zoology. The public is welcome and admission is free (2018). The Museum of Zoology is in the David Attenborough Building, formerly known as the Arup Building, on the New Museums Site, just north of Downing Street in central Cambridge, England. The building also provides a home for the Cambridge Conservation Initiative, a biodiversity project.

The museum houses an extensive collection of scientifically important zoological material. The collections were designated in 1998 by the Museums, Libraries and Archives Council (now managed by the Arts Council England) as being of outstanding historical and international importance.

The museum reopened on 23 June 2018 after a major redevelopment for which it had been awarded a grant of £1.8m by the Heritage Lottery Fund.

The redevelopment aimed to create a "green" building" and to create displays and new interpretation to engage people with the wonders of animal diversity; create new stores to care for the museum's internationally significant collections to the highest standards and expand the museum's learning programmes, reaching out to wider audiences and increasing online resources.

The museum is one of the eight museums of the University of Cambridge Museums consortium.

== History of the museum ==
Much of the museum's material derives from the great collecting expeditions of the 19th century, which provided the first documentation of the fauna in many parts of the world. The earliest exhibits come from the Harwood anatomical collection which was purchased in 1814. The museum added further collections including birds from William Swainson and animals from the Cambridge Philosophical Society, to which Charles Darwin himself had contributed.

Past superintendents of the museum include: William Clark 1817–1866, John Willis Clark 1866–1892, Sidney Frederic Harmer 1892–1908, Reginald Crundall Punnett 1908–1909, and Leonard Doncaster 1909–1914.

The museum was moved into the current purpose-designed building during 1968–70. Five separate stores currently house the collection of specimens. Small refurbishments were made in 2017.

== Collections ==
Many of the collections were assembled during the nineteenth century, which was a key period for the development of modern biology. Much of the material was accumulated between 1865 and 1915 through private collections and expeditions. Cambridge was a centre of major importance for the development of biology, and several of the individuals associated with the museum were central figures in the most active areas of scientific debate.

Collections and letters from various collectors are on display, including collections of:

- F.M. Balfour, Professor of Zoology
- George Robert Crotch, entomologist
- Charles Darwin, Naturalist
- Sir Clive Forster-Cooper, former director of the museum
- John Henry Gurney Sr., banker and amateur ornithologist
- James Hepburn, Ornithologist
- Reverend Leonard Jenyns, originally chosen as the naturalist for the voyage of HMS Beagle
- Robert MacAndrew, amateur naturalist and shell-collector
- Alfred Newton, zoologist and ornithologist.
- Hugh Strickland, ornithologist
- William Swainson, ornithologist
- Alfred Russel Wallace, co-originator of the theory of natural selection
- Henry Woodward, geologist

Fin whale skeleton, Museum of Zoology Cambridge

Before the redevelopment a 21.3 m (70 ft) finback whale skeleton, colloquially known as Bobby, was displayed at the entrance of the museum; it was dismantled and stored during the redevelopment. The new interior entrance hall now contains this skeleton which was extensively cleaned before being reassembled. Skeletons and preserved skins of many extinct animals are housed in the museum. Most of the fish specimens are stored in spirit, some of them having been collected by Darwin himself on the voyage of HMS Beagle from 1831 - 1836. The bird collection consists of skins, eggs and skeletal material. There are skeletal remains from extinct birds such as the dodo from Mauritius and the Rodrigues solitaire from Rodrigues in the collection. The insect collection contains specimens collected by Darwin from around Cambridge. Collections of molluscs, corals and other sea-dwellers offer insight into the biological diversity of the oceans.

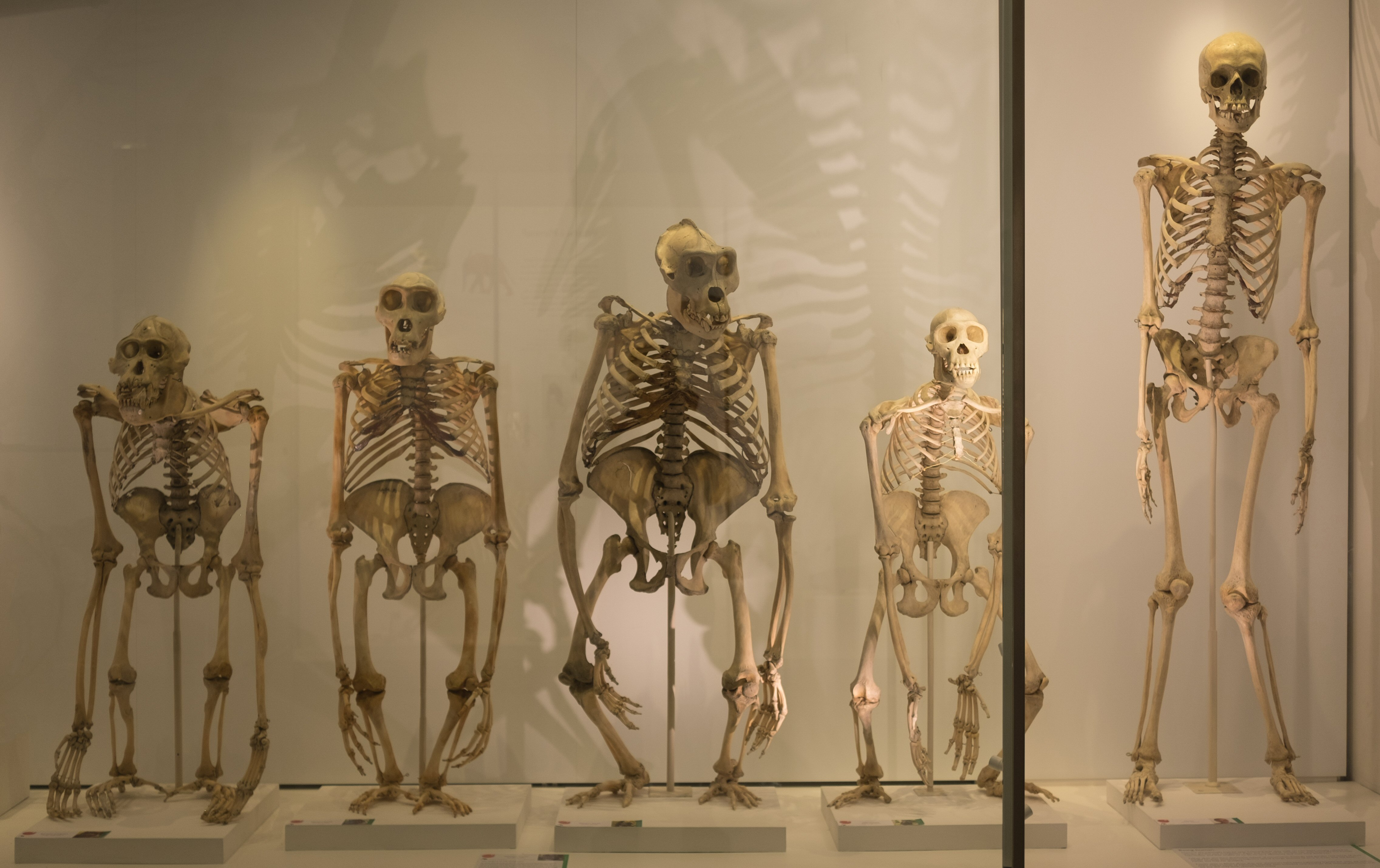
Left to right: Bornean orangutan, female and male western gorilla, chimpanzee, human

== See also ==
- Natural history museums
