= Reuben Rahming =

Bahamian politician

Member of the Senate of the Bahamas
- Incumbent
- Assumed office 6 October 2021

MP for Pinewood
- In office 2017–2021

Personal details
- Born: 14 September 1970 (age 55) Nassau
- Party: Free National Movement

Reuben Rahming (born 14 September 1970) is a Bahamian politician from the Free National Movement.

== Career ==
Rahming was member of the House of Assembly for Pinewood from 2017 to 2021. In 2021, he was appointed to the Senate of the Bahamas.
