= Tyrel Young =

Bahamian politician

Member of the Senate of the Bahamas
- Incumbent
- Assumed office 6 October 2021

Personal details
- Party: Progressive Liberal Party

Tyrel Young is a Bahamian politician from the Progressive Liberal Party (PLP). He is a member of the Senate.

== Career ==
Young was Chairman of the Bahamas Agricultural and Industrial Corporation. In 2024, he was appointed to the Ministry of Agriculture.
