= Barry N. Griffin =

Bahamian Businessman and Political Figure

The Honourable Barry N. Griffin

Vice President of The Senate
- Incumbent
- Assumed office 21 September 2021
- Prime Minister: Philip "Brave" Davis

Personal details
- Party: Progressive Liberal Party
- Education: Saint John's University, King's College London

Barry N. Griffin is a Bahamian commercial attorney, businessman, and political figure. He is currently the Vice President of The Senate in the Parliament of the Bahamas and currently serves as Chairman of The Bahamas Trade Commission and the Chief Trade Negotiator for The Bahamas. Griffin's portfolio centers around economic competitiveness, trade diversification, and support for MSMEs in The Bahamas.

== Early life and education ==
Barry N. Griffin was born in Nassau, The Bahamas. He received his early education at St. Thomas More School and then Saint Augustine's College, both in Nassau, The Bahamas. Griffin then obtained a Bachelor's Degree in International Relations and Economics from Saint John's University in Minnesota after which he obtained a law degree from King's College London, University of London in the United Kingdom.

Griffin is a member of both the Bar of England and Wales and the Bahamas Bar Association.

== Business career ==
Barry N. Griffin is a lawyer by profession having worked in boutique commercial law firms in The Bahamas, where he practiced as a corporate and commercial attorney. His areas of specialization include financial services regulation, corporate governance, private client advisory, fintech and digital assets, and small and medium-sized business counsel.

In 2019, Griffin founded a boutique commercial consultancy firm focused on serving high-net-worth individuals and multinational corporations with private wealth and business interests in The Bahamas. This firm evolved into having interests in law, international business services, and investments in emerging markets.

== Political career ==
Griffin is a member of the Progressive Liberal Party (PLP). He served as Chairman of the Progressive Young Liberals from 2017 to 2019, then as National Vice Chairman of the PLP from 2019 to 2021. Following the PLP's election victory in September 2021, Griffin was appointed to the Senate by Prime Minister Philip Davis and subsequently elected by his parliamentary colleagues as Vice President of the Senate, becoming the youngest person in Bahamian history to hold the position.

From October 2021 to November 2024, he served as Deputy Chairman of The Bahamas Trade Commission, before being elevated to Chairman in late 2024. In this capacity, Griffin also acts as the Chief Trade Negotiator for the Bahamas, overseeing trade negotiations and the government's efforts in trade diversification, export development, and economic integration with global markets.

Griffin also heads initiatives to introduce competition legislation, aimed at promoting fairness in the Bahamian economy and greater access for small and medium size businesses, women and young entrepreneurs.

== International engagement ==
Griffin has represented the Bahamas at various international forums including the Organisation of African, Caribbean and Pacific States (OACPS), the Inter-Parliamentary Union (IPU), the Organisation of American States (OAS), and other multilateral bodies.
