= Wayde Watson =

Bahamian politician

Member of Parliament for Bains Town & Grants Town
- Incumbent
- Assumed office 6 October 2021
- Preceded by: Travis Robinson
- Majority: 1,073 (37.02%)

Personal details
- Born: Wayde Alexander Watson
- Party: Progressive Liberal Party

Wayde Alexander Watson is a Bahamian Progressive Liberal Party politician. He was elected Member of Parliament for Bain Town and Grants Town in 2021. Watson is parliamentary secretary for the Ministry of Finance.

Prior to being elected to Parliament, Watson worked in the information and technology sector. He was head coach of The Bahamas women's national basketball team.
