= Crooked Island, Bahamas =

Island and District in the Bahamas

District of Crooked Island and Long Cay
- Island and district
- Coordinates: 22°45′N 74°12′W
- Country: Bahamas
- District: 1999

Government
  - Type: District Council
  - Chief Councillor: David Daxon Sr.

Area
  - Total: 148 km^{2} (57 sq mi)

Population (2022)
  - Total: 305
  - Density: 2.06/km^{2} (5.34/sq mi)
- Time zone: UTC−5 (EST)
  - Summer (DST): UTC−4 (EDT)
- Area code: 242

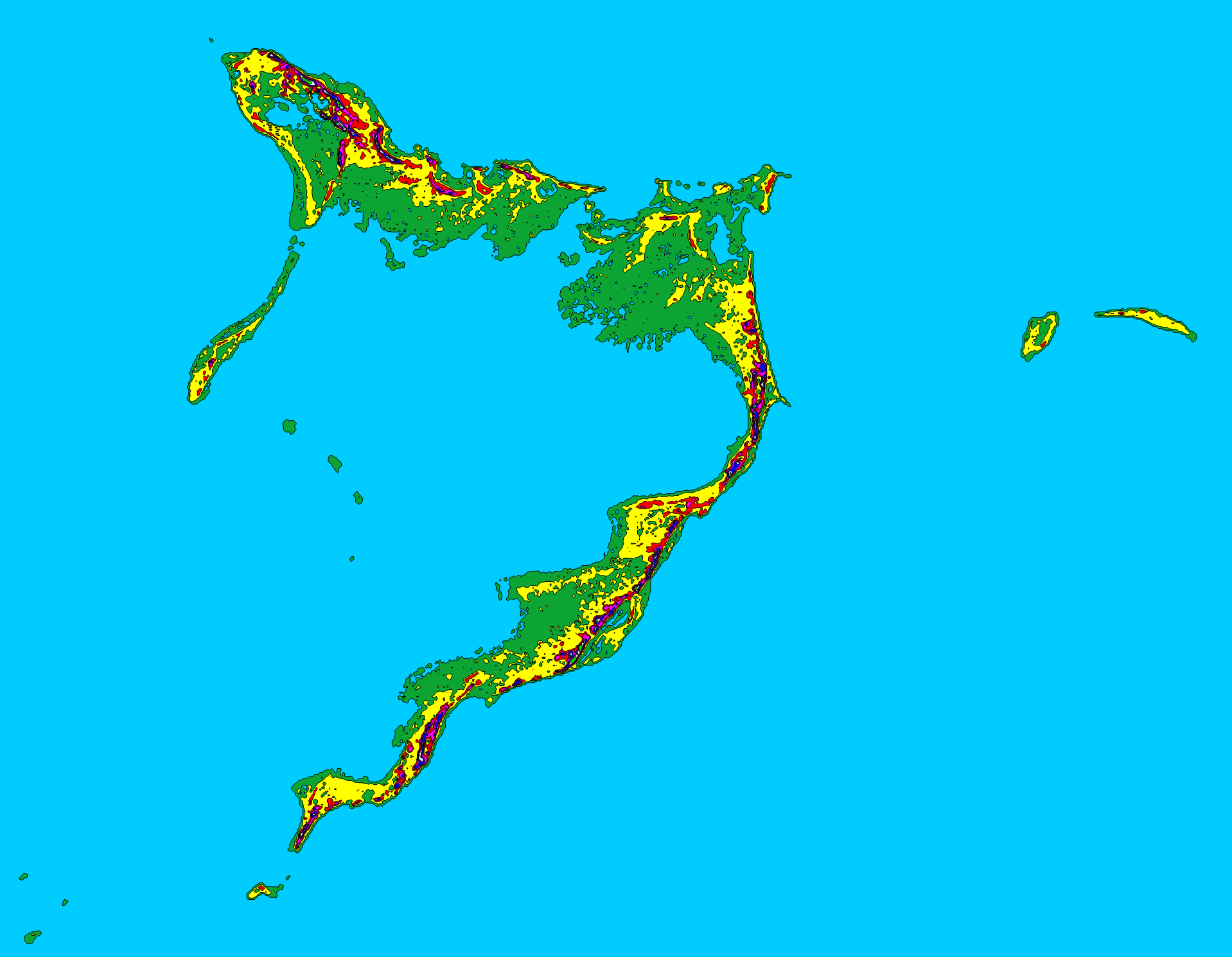
Topographic map of Acklins Island and Crooked Island.

Crooked Island is an island and district, part of a group of Bahamian islands defining a large, shallow lagoon called the Bight of Acklins, of which the largest are Crooked Island in the north and Acklins in the south-east, and the smaller are Long Cay (once known as Fortune Island) in the north-west, and Castle Island in the south.

== Etymology ==
The Indigenous Lucayan people called the island Jumento, meaning "upper land of the middle distance". Meanwhile, the Spaniard explorers had named the island Isabella.

== History ==
The islands were settled by American Loyalists in the late 1780s who set cotton plantations using over 1,000 slaves. After the abolition of slavery in the British Empire these became uneconomical, and the replacement income from sponge diving has now dwindled as well. The inhabitants now live by fishing and small-scale farming.

It is believed that the first Post Office in the Bahamas was at Pitts Town on Crooked Island.

== Population ==
The main town in the group is Colonel Hill (pop. 51) on Crooked Island.

The population of Crooked Island was 330 at the 2010 census.

== Transportation ==
The island is served by Colonel Hill Airport.

== Politics ==
The island is part of the MICAL constituency for elections to the House of Assembly of the Bahamas.
