= Pineridge (Bahamas Parliament constituency) =

- Constituency
- Pineridge is number 27
- District: Grand Bahama

Current constituency
- Created: 1977
- Seats: 1
- Party: Progressive Liberal Party
- Member: Ginger Moxey

Pineridge is a parliamentary constituency represented in the House of Assembly of the Bahamas created in 1977. It elects one Member of Parliament (MP) using a first past the post system. It is held by the Progressive Liberal Party (PLP) and has Ginger Moxey as its MP.

== Members of Parliament ==
Election	Candidate	Party	Notes
1977	Garnet Levarity	FNM	
1982	Cornelius A. Smith	FNM	
2002	Ann E. Percentie	PLP	
2007	Kwasi Thompson	FNM	
2012	Michael Darville	PLP	
2017	Frederick McAlpine	FNM	
July 2021	Frederick McAlpine	Independent	
2021	Ginger Moxey	PLP	
2026	Ginger Moxey	PLP	

== Elections ==
General Election 2021: Pineridge
Party	Candidate	Votes	%	±%
PLP	Ginger Moxey	1,423	40.05	▼2.90
Independent	Frederick McAlpine	1,175	33.07	N/A
FNM	Welbourne Bootle	886	24.94	▼28.00
KGM	Belinda Williams	34	0.96	New
Independent (politician)	Shan Wilson	19	0.53	New
Grand Commonwealth Party	Tavia Lowe	16	0.45	New
Turnout		3,553	62.66	
Registered electors		5,670		
PLP gain from Independent				

General Election 2017: Pineridge
Party	Candidate	Votes	%	±%
FNM	Frederick McAlpine	2,496	52.94	▲13.95
PLP	Michael Darville	2,025	42.95	▼13.88
DNA	Leslie Lightbourne	177	3.75	▼0.43
BCP	Kendall Knowles	17	0.36	New
Turnout		4,715		▲
Registered electors				
FNM gain from PLP				

General Election 2012: Pineridge
Party	Candidate	Votes	%	±%
PLP	Michael Darville	2,635	56.83	▲10.08
FNM	Kwasi Thompson	1,808	38.99	▼14
DNA	Osman Johnson	194	4.18	New
Turnout		4,637		▲
Registered electors				
PLP gain from FNM				

General Election 2007: Pineridge
Party	Candidate	Votes	%	±%
FNM	Kwasi Thompson	1,869	52.99	▲
PLP	Ann E. Percentie	1,649	46.75	▼
Independent	Edwin Moss	9	0.26	New
Turnout		3,527		▼
Registered electors				
FNM gain from PLP				

General Election 2002: Pineridge
Party	Candidate	Votes	%	±%
PLP	Ann E. Percentie	2,183	59.84	
FNM	Cornelius A. Smith	1,402	38.43	
Coalition + Labor	Velma Smith	63	1.73	New
Turnout		3,648		▲
Registered electors				
PLP gain from FNM				

General Election 1997: Pineridge
Party	Candidate	Votes	%	±%
FNM	Cornelius A. Smith	2,104		
PLP	Ann E. Percentie	1,409		
Turnout		3,513		
Registered electors				
FNM hold				

== See also ==
- Constituencies of the Bahamas
