= Kwasi Thompson =

Bahamian politician

Member of the Parliament of the Bahamas for East Grand Bahama
- Incumbent
- Assumed office 2021

Personal details
- Born: James Kwasi Malik Thompson; August 21, 1975 (age 49)
- Political party: Free National Movement

James Kwasi Malik Thompson (born 21 August 1975) is a Bahamian politician from the Free National Movement. He is member of the Parliament of the Bahamas for East Grand Bahama.

== Career ==
Thompson served as the member of parliament for Pineridge from 2007 to 2012.

In December 2020, he was appointed minister of state for finance.

== See also ==
- 14th Bahamian Parliament
