= Erecia Hepburn =

Bahamian politician

Member of the Senate of the Bahamas
- Incumbent
- Assumed office 6 October 2021

Personal details
- Party: Progressive Liberal
- Website: https://www.electerecia.com/

Erecia Hepburn-Forbes is a Bahamian politician from the Progressive Liberal Party. In 2021, she was appointed to the Senate of the Bahamas.

She is President of the Bahamas Agriculture and Marine Science Institute. She is a professor at the University of the Bahamas.
