= Ministry of Health (The Bahamas) =

Government ministry of the Bahamas

Ministry of Health Bahamas and Wellness

Agency overview
- Formed: 1969; 57 years ago
- Preceding agency: Department of Public Health
- Jurisdiction: (The Bahamas) Bahamas
- Headquarters: Nassau, New Providence
- Minister responsible: Dr. Duane Sands, Minister; Maisie Evans, Secretary

The Ministry of Health and Wellness is a ministry in the Bahamas Government. Ministry plans, supervises, licenses and coordinates the country's healthcare services.

== Cabinet ==
Name	Position	Party	Period
Renward Wells	Minister	Free National Movement	2021–Present
Dr. Daniel Zucev Maric	Deputy Minister	Nonpartisan	2016-
Prenell King-Rolle	Permanent Secretary	Nonpartisan	2021–Present
Merceline Dahl-Regis	Cabinet Office	Free National Movement	2017-

Free National Movement Nonpartisan

== Areas of responsibility ==
The Ministry of Health Duane Sands seeks to provide the leadership necessary to ensure and guard the protection and promotion of the health of all residents. It provides all residents with access to comprehensive, preventive, quality healthcare services and care.

The Ministry of Health seeks to protect the health of Bahamian residents against both current and emerging health threats. This is achieved, in part, by: helping individuals acquire the skills to live responsible, healthy and independent lives; providing a range of accessible, affordable services that assist individuals, families and communities to reach their full health potential; and monitoring both current and emerging disease threats.

The Ministry operates from a social model of health, whereby improvements in health and well-being are achieved by directing efforts towards addressing the social and environmental determinants of health, among others. The delivery of healthcare in The Bahamas is integrated and co-ordinated around the needs of residents, rather than service types, professional boundaries or organisational structure.

== Departments and agencies ==
=== Technical Directorate ===
The Technical Directorate of the Ministry is composed of the Chief Medical Officer, Director of Public Health, and Director of Nursing.

The Chief Medical Officer advises both the Minister and the Permanent Secretary on technical, health matters.

The Director of Public Health has oversight for the Department of Public Health and advises the Permanent Secretary on all Public Health Matters.

The Director of Nursing directs and advises the Permanent Secretary on all Nursing Matters.

== Ministers of Health ==
- Loftus Roker, 1973-1977
- Perry Christie, 1977-1982
- Livingston Coakley, 1982-1984
- Norman Gay, 1984-1990
- Charles Carter, 1991-1992
- Ivy Dumont, 1992-1995
- Theresa Moxey-lngraham, 1995-1997
- Ronald Knowles, 1997-2002
- Marcus Bethel, 2002-?
- Hubert Minnis, 2007-2012
- Perry Gomez, 2012-?
- Duane Sands, ?-2020
- Renward Wells, 2020
- Michael Darville, 2021-
