= Jomo Campbell =

Politician

Jomo Campbell M.P.
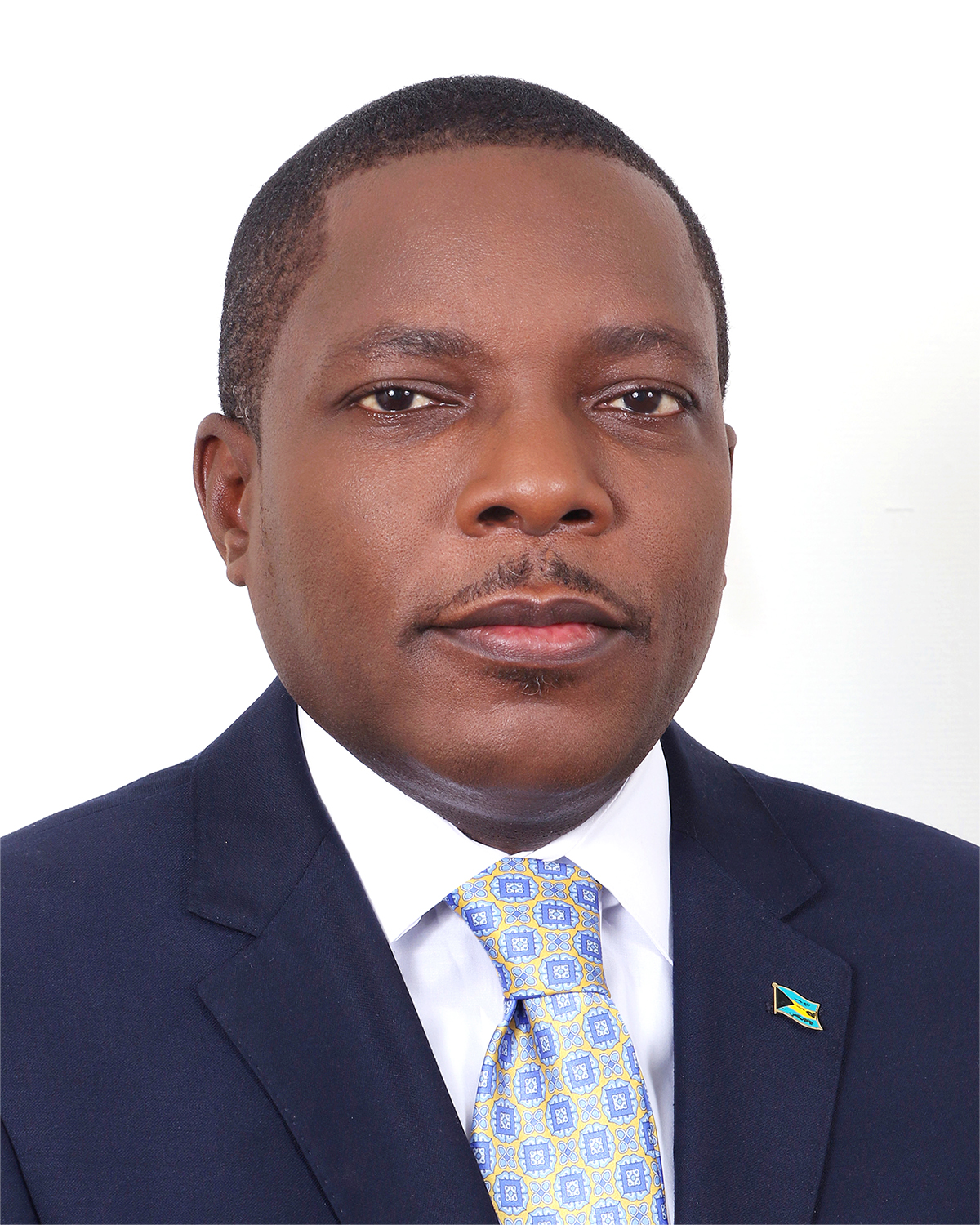

Minister of Agriculture and Marine Resources
- Incumbent
- Assumed office 4 September 2023
- Prime Minister: Philip "Brave" Davis
- Preceded by: Clay Sweeting (Agriculture, Fisheries, and Local Government)

Minister of State for Legal Affairs
- In office 23 September 2021 – 4 September 2023
- Prime Minister: Philip "Brave" Davis
- Preceded by: Elsworth Johnson
- Succeeded by: position abolished

Member of Parliament for Centreville
- Incumbent
- Assumed office 16 September 2021
- Preceded by: Reece Chipman
- Majority: 1,561 (47.89%)

Personal details
- Born: Jomo Chaka Campbell Bahamas
- Party: Progressive Liberal Party
- Spouse: Nathalie Campbell

Jomo Chaka Campbell is a Bahamian Progressive Liberal Party politician who serves as Minister of Agriculture and Marine Resources. He is currently the Member of Parliament for Centreville.

== Career ==
Jomo Campbell is a former Attorney-at-Law and currently a politician within the Commonwealth of The Bahamas. Born on March 15, 1979, in New Providence, he pursued a Bachelor of Business Administration in Management at Saint John’s University, graduating in 1999. Continuing his education, he earned an LLB in 2002 and an LLM from Buckingham University in London. In October 2005, he was called to The Bahamas Bar. Mr. Campbell began his legal career at Lockhart & Munroe, dedicating 15 years to the profession before transitioning to politics.

=== Parliament ===
Campbell was elected to Parliament in 2021, defeating FNM candidate, engineer Courtney Coulibaly, flipping the seat of Centreville.

As a member of parliament, Campbell has served in various roles. In September 2021, Prime Minister Philip "Brave" Davis appointed him as Minister of State for Legal Affairs. He served under Attorney General and Minister of Legal Affairs, Ryan Pinder. As Minister of State, he focused on reforming the justice system and promoting access to justice.

In 2023, during a cabinet reshuffle, Prime Minister Davis appointed Campbell as the Minister of Agriculture and Marine Resources. As minister, Campbell has advocated for sustainable agriculture practices and food security, marine conservation, fisheries management, and the development of policies and programs to drive economic growth and job creation. As minister, he helped address the impact of Hurricane Dorian, and he has represented the Bahamas at regional and international forums, including the Food and Agriculture Organization (FAO) and the Caribbean Community (CARICOM).

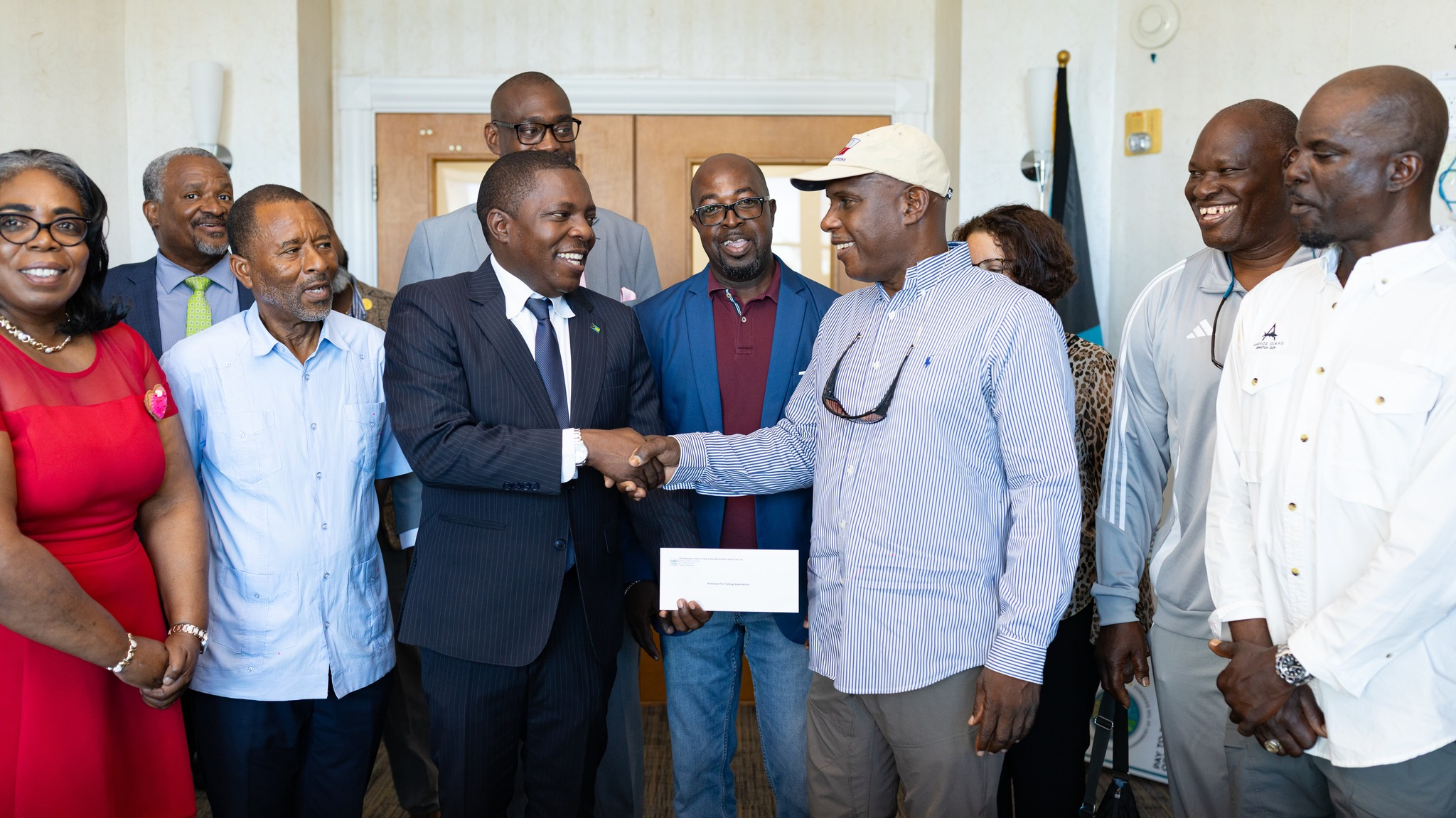
Hon Jomo Campbell shakes hand with Prescott Smith - President of The Bahamas fly fishing industry association. As a donation of $150,000 was given to the association towards the advancement of the industry within the country.

== Electoral history ==
2021 Centreville constituency election
Party	Candidate	Votes	Percentage
PLP	Jomo Campbell	2,170	66.58%
FNM	Courtney B. Coulibaly	609	18.69%
IND	Reece Chipman	205	6.29%
COI	Ambrose Nixon	200	6.14%
	Others	78	2.30%
Total		3,262	100%
