= Bain Town and Grants Town (Bahamas Parliament constituency) =

Bahamas parliamentary constituency

- Constituency
- Bain Town and Grants Town is number 23
- District: New Providence

Current constituency
- Seats: 1
- Party: Progressive Liberal Party
- Member: Wayde Watson

Bain Town and Grants Town is a parliamentary constituency represented in the House of Assembly of the Bahamas. It is one of the largest constituencies with over 5,000 voters.

== Political history ==
Historically, the constituency has been a PLP stronghold.

== Members of Parliament ==
Election	Member	Party
1982	Bradley Roberts	PLP
1987	Bradley Roberts	PLP
1992	Bradley Roberts	PLP
1997	Bradley Roberts	PLP
2002	Bradley Roberts	PLP
2007		PLP
2012	Bernard Nottage	PLP
2017	Travis Robinson	FNM
2021	Wayde Watson	PLP

== Election results ==
=== 2021 ===
2021
Party	Candidate	Votes	%	±%
PLP	Wayde Watson	1,835	63.30	
FNM	Travis Robinson	762	26.28	
COI	Donna Dorsett-Major	142	4.90	
DNA	Kino Sheffield Lockhart	64	2.21	
GCP	Michelle Malcolm	55	1.90	
UCM	Brenda Harris-Pinder	41	1.41	
Turnout		2,899	60.02	
Swing to PLP from FNM		Swing		

== See also ==
- Constituencies of the Bahamas
