= 2021 Bahamian general election =

- 16 September 2021

All 39 seats in the House of Assembly 20 seats needed for a majority
- Registered: 194,524
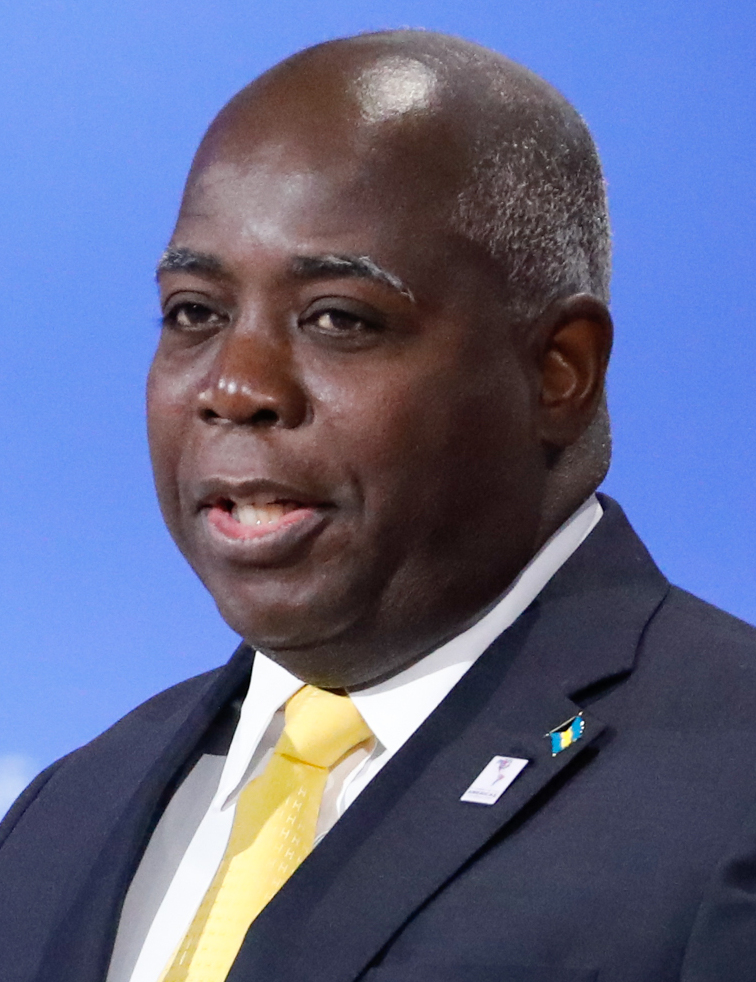

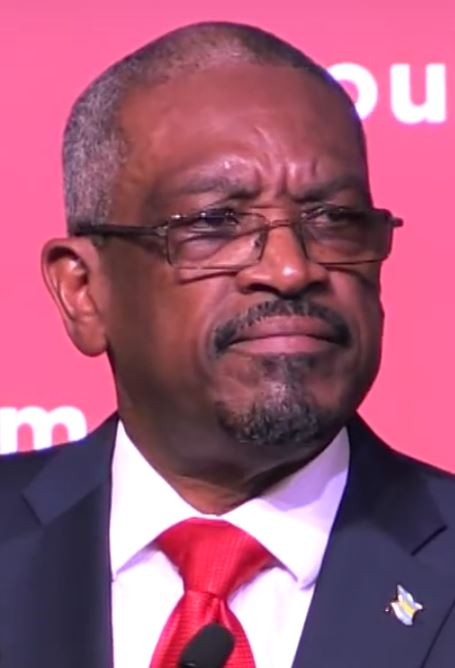
	First party	Second party
Leader	Philip Davis	Hubert Minnis
Party	PLP	FNM
Last election	36.94%, 4 seats	56.99%, 35 seats
Seats won	32	7
Seat change	▲28	▼28
Popular vote	66,407	46,030
Percentage	52.59%	36.45%
Prime Minister before election
Hubert Minnis
FNM
Elected Prime Minister
Philip Davis
PLP

General elections were held in the Bahamas on 16 September 2021 to elect all 39 members of the House of Assembly.

Around two hours after the polls closed, and results started to trickle in, Prime Minister Hubert Minnis conceded defeat, after results showed his party Free National Movement losing several seats they previously held. Since 1997, every election has resulted in a change of government. On 17 September Philip Davis of the Progressive Liberal Party was sworn in as prime minister.

== Background ==
The Bahamas has been affected by the COVID-19 pandemic.

In January 2021, it was reported that the PLP was expecting an early election.

At dissolution, the FNM was down four seats on their 2017 result; House Speaker Halson Moultrie, Reece Chipman, and Frederick McAlpine left the party to sit and run for re-election as independents, whilst Vaughn Miller defected to the PLP.

In the run up to the 2021 election, there were plans to implement biometric I.D. Cards which could be used for voting, however, such a proposal did not materialize by the time of the election.

== Electoral system ==
Members of the House of Assembly are elected from single-member constituencies using first-past-the-post voting. The majority party then selects the Prime Minister, who is appointed by the Governor-General.

== Candidates ==
On 3 February, the Progressive Liberal Party revealed their first 18 candidates. On 21 June 2021, they selected the rest of their candidates for the election. The Free National Movement completed ratifying candidates by July 2021.

The Democratic National Alliance posted a list of 19 candidates in March 2021. New parties include Coalition of Independents, formed by members of Bahamian Evolution, and the Grand Commonwealth Party. House Speaker Moultrie formed an electoral alliance of independent and third-party candidates.

== Results ==
The elections were observed by several teams, including those from the Caribbean Community, the Commonwealth and the Organisation of American States.

Party	Votes	%	Seats	+/–
Progressive Liberal Party	66,407	52.59	32	+28
Free National Movement	46,030	36.45	7	–28
Coalition of Independents	8,388	6.64	0	New
Democratic National Alliance	1,497	1.19	0	0
United Coalition Movement	590	0.47	0	New
Kingdom Government Movement	530	0.42	0	New
Grand Commonwealth Party	260	0.21	0	New
Bahamas Constitution Party	120	0.10	0	0
Righteous Government Movement	61	0.05	0	New
Faith that Moves Mountains Party	18	0.01	0	New
Bahamian Way Forward Movement	11	0.01	0	New
Independents	2,359	1.87	0	0
Total	126,271	100.00	39	0
Registered voters/turnout	194,524	–		
Source: Parliamentary Registration Department, CLEA

=== Seat that changed hands ===
==== Free National to Progressive Liberal ====
- Bain Town and Grants Town: won by Wayde Watson
- Bamboo Town: won by Patricia Deveaux
- Carmichael: won by Keith Bell
- Central and South Abaco: won by John Pinder II
- Central and South Eleuthera: won by Clay Sweeting
- Centreville: won by Jomo Campbell
- Elizabeth: won by JoBeth Coleby-Davis
- Fort Charlotte: won by Alfred Sears
- Fox Hill: won by Fred Mitchell
- Freetown: won by Wayne Munroe
- Garden Hills: won by Mario Bowleg
- Golden Gates: won by Pia Glover-Rolle
- Golden Isles: won by Vaughn Miller
- Marathon: won by Lisa Rahming
- MICAL: won by Basil McIntosh
- Mount Moriah: won by Mckell Bonaby
- Nassau Village: won by Jamahl Strachan
- North Abaco: won by Kirk Cornish
- North Andros and Berry Islands: won by Leonardo Lightbourne
- North Eleuthera: won by Sylvannus Petty
- Pineridge: won by Ginger Moxey
- Pinewood: won by Myles Laroda
- Sea Breeze: won by Leslia Miller-Brice
- South Beach: won by Bacchus Rolle
- Southern Shores: won by Leroy Major
- Tall Pines: won by Michael Darville
- Yamacraw: won by Zane Lightbourne

== Reactions ==
- Free National Movement: In a concession speech released by the FNM, outgoing prime minister Hubert Minnis thanked Bahamians for the last four years. "Tonight I spoke with Leader of the Progressive Liberal Party Philip Davis and offered my congratulations to him and his party on their victory at the polls. I offered him my best wishes as his Government now faces the continued fight against COVID-19, and the restoration of our economy. I would like to thank the tens of thousands of Bahamians from across The Bahamas who voted for Free National Movement candidates. I also congratulate the FNM candidates who won seats in the House of Assembly. I am in that number, and again my gratitude goes out to the people of Killarney for making me their representative for the fourth consecutive time. I will lead the Free National Movement into the House as the leader of Her Majesty’s Loyal Opposition. The Bahamas has a proud democratic tradition. The people decide who serves as government."
- Progressive Liberal Party: Philip Davis expected to become the next prime minister addressed supporters in Cat Island. He told constituents "Thank you for seeing the possibilities of what we can build together for our children and grandchildren, in the morning, we will rise as one nation and meet the challenges ahead."

== Aftermath ==
On 17 September Davis was sworn in as prime minister.
