= Lucaya International School =

International school in Freeport, The Bahamas

Location
- Chesapeake Dr., Midshipman Rd. Freeport, Grand Bahama Island; Bahamas; 26°32′45.0″N 78°35′38.1″W

Information
- School type: International School
- Religious affiliations: Accepts All Religions & Beliefs
- Founded: 1998
- Head of school: Kathryn Dillette
- Grades: Pre Kindergarten - Year 13
- Gender: Accepts Both Genders, Male & Female
- Age range: 3-18
- Enrollment: 280
- Language: English, Spanish & French
- Hours in school day: 8
- Campus type: Suburban
- Colour: Red/White/Blue
- Sports: Soccer, Basketball, Softball, Volleyball, Track Ń Field
- Mascot: The Buccaneer
- Team name: Buccaneers
- Accreditation: IBO PYP & IBO DP
- Yearbook: Lucaya International School 2013 - 2014 Student Year Book
- L.I.S Celebrations!: L.I.S celebrates Bahamas Day etc. with amazing music, fun and dancing. We also celebrate holidays and have Winter Concerts.
- Accepting Others: We accept all differences between others including religion, color/race, gender, ages etc.
- Sports & Clubs: L.I.S. has club sign-up sheets for tennis lessons, creative activities, homework clubs etc.
- Website: www.lucayainternationalschool.com

Lucaya International School is an international school in Freeport, Grand Bahama Island. The schools offers early years to grade 13 education to Bahamians and foreign residents.

== The school ==
The school was founded in 1998 with the main goal of offering an internationally based curriculum to the expatriate and local community. The school has an enrollment of 230 students. Approximately 40% are Bahamian Nationals, with the remainder coming from over 30 countries. The school is located in the suburb of Lucaya, on an open campus with sport fields.

== Curriculum ==
The school is authorized to offer the International Baccalaureate Organization IB Primary Years Programme (PYP) to primary age students, and the IB Diploma Programme to secondary students. Middle years students are offered an adapted UK National Curriculum, and the school offers IGCSE exams in Year 11.
