= Wallace Groves =

American financier based in the Bahamas

Wallace Groves (20 March 1900 – 30 January 1988) was an American financier and fraudster. After release from federal prison in 1944, he moved to the Bahamas where he founded and operated a free trade zone, resort, and casino development at what would become Freeport, Grand Bahama. He is credited with the development of the modern Bahamian economy of offshore banking. He was suspected to have links with the Meyer Lansky syndicate operating offshore casinos from Miami Beach.

== Early life and education ==
Wallace Groves was born in Norfolk, Virginia on 20 March 1900. He attended Ursinus College and Georgetown University and was admitted to the Maryland Bar in 1925.

== Pre-war financier ==
He moved to New York from Baltimore, where he was a bond salesman. Groves made an early career in financial transactions on Wall Street. He was "a young, flashy, and successful investor, he was involved in several businesses and had controlling interests in several others, including the United Cigar Store and the Whelan Drug Store chain."

In 1931, Groves began to assemble a collection of investment trusts and other companies through complex transactions, which came to follow a certain pattern. At the time, he was reported to have a net worth of $19 million.

=== Chain and General Equities ===
In 1931, Groves obtained control of Chain and General Equities by underwriting an offering to the stockholders of additional stock and then caused the election of officers of his choice to the board of directors, according to the SEC. Groves then sold to the company "642,517 shares of common stock of Interstate Equities Corp. for appr. $1,325,000 with a gross profit of $369,000 to said Wallace Groves." The stock had "little or no asset value."

=== Suspicions ===
Two other companies, Interstate Equities of New York and Yosemite Holding of Detroit, also came under the control of Groves's Equity Corporation, by December 1932, netting Groves the market value of these companies "with the expenditure of very small amount of money." Stockholders filed suit against Groves and his associates. In 1933, Groves sold his control of Equity Corp to David M. Milton and Ellery Huntington Jr. His transactions caught the attention of the Securities and Exchange Commission (SEC), and from 1933 until his imprisonment in 1941, he was frequently in the news for legal or regulatory matters. Numerous other suspect transactions of similar nature were revealed to the public by the SEC.

=== Phoenix Securities ===
In 1936, Groves was president of the Phoenix Securities Corp., with Philip de Ronde, chairman, and Walter S. Mack, Jr., vice-president. This company acquired control of, among others, the South Coast Co., the Celotex Co., and Allied Products. Corp. Groves acquired Phoenix through a hostile take-over in 1931. Phoenix then obtained control of Autocar, United Cigar, Certain-Teed Products, Whelan Drug Stores and other companies. By 1936, Groves revealed that he, as sole owner of offshore Company Montana of Panama, could carry out transactions through it without incurring taxes. This and other uses of foreign tax havens caused the Treasury Department to report Groves, de Ronde and others to the Congressional Joint Committee to Investigate Income Tax Avoidance and Evasion, alleging "financial legerdemain". Groves then also owned Nassau Securities, Ltd, a Bahamian shell company; de Ronde owned a similar shell. The Bahamian companies served as depositories for funds drained from U.S. companies in the orbit of Groves.

=== Legal troubles ===
On 1 December 1938, the United States indicted Wallace Groves, his brother George S. Groves, Ernest B. Warriner (fugitive in Canada) and de Ronde (fugitive in France) on fifteen counts of mail fraud and conspiracy to defraud.

The case attracted considerable attention in financial circles, where Groves was socially prominent. After lengthy, contested proceedings, on 21 February 1941, the two Groves brothers were convicted. Wallace got two years in federal prison at Danbury, Connecticut. George got eight months. They were each fined $22,000. After his release, Wallace Groves moved to the Bahamas.

== Post-war interests in the Bahamas ==
=== Abaco Lumber Co ===
Groves first became interested in running a real business in the Bahamas through a lumber and sawmill operation on the largely undeveloped Grand Bahama Island 81 miles off the Florida coast. He used the Abaco Lumber Co. as the springboard for further business ventures. Grand Bahama was deforested in the process.

=== Hawksbill Bill Creek agreement ===
From 1946, Bahamian finance minister and Member of Parliament Stafford Sands served as Wallace Groves's lawyer and helped pave the way for his business interests. In 1955, Groves secured the seminal Hawksbill Creek Agreement with the colonial government, ceding to him 211 square miles of Grand Bahama Island upon which to develop a free-trade industrial and resort zone. (Groves obtained supplemental agreements in 1960 and 1966.) The agreement freed the Grand Bahama Port Authority from paying taxes, tolls, and excises for 25 years (since extended to 2054), and exempted it from other Bahamian laws, notably immigration laws. By 1965, 416 companies operated under license to the main exempted company. The zone gradually became the most modern, well-run, and prosperous part of the colony, although it was described as only nominally Bahamian.

In 1963, after internal self-government was granted to the Bahamas, Groves further secured the right to operate gambling establishments at Freeport, using the services of Stafford Sands. At the same time, Sands and other high government officials received payments exceeding $1,000,000 from the Grand Bahamas Port Authority.

=== Investigations ===
The complex system of continuing payoffs to the "Bay Street Boys" — the white elite who controlled the Bahamas government — was detailed by the Royal Commission of Inquiry of 1967. The payments from the three casinos (a third was built near Nassau) continued until the United Bahamian Party (UBP) lost power in the 1967 elections.

These payments were subject to investigation by the 1967 Commission of Inquiry. They were also detailed in an extensive exposé in Life Magazine, 3 February 1967. It was later reported that the decision to operate the casinos was taken in Miami Beach in 1961, at the mob-run Hotel Fontainebleau at which Meyer Lansky and other mob kingpins were present, and the hotel architect had included a central interior 9,000 sqft "squash ball court" which became the casino. According to Life, the Groves domains were merely the most lucrative component of a complex network of state-sanctioned criminal activities centered on off-shore companies, including money laundering and insurance fraud.

One source (Valentine, 2004) holds that Groves had fronted for Lansky "since 1951, when he sold valuable Key Biscayne property" for him, but another (Block, 1998) holds that Louis Chesler (see below) moved Groves into the Lansky orbit in 1961. The American public came to know first of the situation in the Bahamas on 5 October 1966, when the Wall Street Journal published a detailed exposé of the trades involving Groves, Sands, Lansky and others. The Journal also wrote that an unpublished tell-all book, The Ugly Bahamian, written by Alan Witver, a former employee of Groves, had been bought up and repressed by Sands.

Groves controlled his company both directly and through various partners. His wife Georgette was part owner, as was a British subject Keith Gonsalves. But Life noted that Groves's "silent partner in all three gambling salons and spokesman for the Syndicate is Lansky." The mob's take from the casinos were then estimated over a million dollars a year.

=== Freeport ===
The Freeport development, complete with a first-rate airport, became very successful and created a prosperous enclave catering primarily to American tourists, including cruise ship passengers, and to expatriate Americans choosing to live in stylish comfort close to U.S. shores. The Lucayan Beach Hotel became well-known and its casino, the Monte Carlo Room, attracted U.S. high-rollers. Reports in the 1960s were that the hotel was struggling, but the casino was exceptionally profitable, and the skim was transferred to the Miami mob. Groves's businesses could not, by statute, be audited in the Bahamas. Groves was also affiliated with the mob-owned La Costa Country Club in San Diego County. He promoted the development in the 1960s on behalf of Moe Dalitz, and was a frequent guest.

=== Associations ===
Wallace Groves was associated with numerous companies, most significantly the well-known Mary Carter Paint Co., which became Resorts International before beginning to operate Atlantic City, New Jersey casinos in 1978. Among objections to this move were listed that "the M.C.P.C….engaged in the purchase of Bahamian real estate with individuals of unsuitable character and nature, specifically Wallace Groves, a convicted swindler, and Louis Chesler, an associate of criminals….The M.C.P.C. entered into partnership with Mr. Groves's wife and staffed one of its casinos after a company official had visited Mr. Lansky." Numerous mob-affiliated gambling experts, including Dino Cellini and many of his family members, worked for Groves in the Bahamas. Chesler, a Canadian, operated the Freeport gambling resort for a number of years. Chesler's criminal associations and work for Groves are detailed in Block (below). In 1965, it was reported that it was Mr. Chesler who brought the promotion, talent and connections necessary to turn the hotel resort and casino into a major success. Chesler, as a British subject, was allowed to operate the casino, but Groves forced him out and replaced him with a Bahamian. It was reported that Chesler, a proven and successful promoter, had shown up in 1960 with $12 million to invest. He brought in "a retinue of jet-set friends and satraps and a go-go attitude." Chesler's surreptitious funneling of $11 million to the Lucayan project caused the collapse of Atlantic Acceptance Corporation of Canada in a major scandal, 15 June 1965. At the same time in 1965, a number of "undesirable" Americans and Italians were ejected from the islands. However, investigators reported that Chesler and his associates still controlled the gambling operations. Chesler testified to the Royal Commission of Inquiry in 1967 that the American underworld had "absolutely no" connection with the Freeport casinos, and that he merely consulted Meyer Lansky for "advice on the staffing of the casino."

=== Waning influence ===
It appeared that after the end of UBP monopoly on power in the Bahamas, Groves's influence was on the wane. The Freeport complex, which was deemed very successful, continued in operation, and in 1968 a new Groves casino complex was opened on Paradise Island near Nassau. It was run by Eddie Cellini. In 1968 and 1978 he sold off parts of his business empire for large sums ($80 and $38 million, respectively). He sold his GBPA interest to Sir Charles Hayward.

== Personal life and death ==
Groves married Georgette Cusson in 1940.

Groves lived in grand style in Freeport in a large, blue-green tiled home, and spent his leisure on his private island, Little Whale Cay 33 miles off Nassau. He ruled his concession in monarchial fashion, known as "King Wallace"... "[r]esidents and employees often complained that the authority which had broad power to expel, ran the island in police-state fashion."

Groves died on 20 January 1988 in Coral Gables, Miami of a stroke at age 86. He was survived by three sons, and two daughters. His wife had died the previous September.

== Allegations of underworld association ==
The activities of Wallace Groves attracted the considerable attention of numerous chroniclers of transnational financial crime on account of his extensive connections with the top names of the financial underworld. The following is a sampling:

- New York Times, 1 February 1988 (obituary).
- Life, 3 February 1967 (expose).
- Wall Street Journal, 5 October 1966 (report).
- Alan Block, Masters of Paradise: Organized Crime and the IRS in the Bahamas. NJ: Transaction Publishers, 1998 (pb edn).
- Michael Craton and Gail Saunders-Smith, Islanders in the Stream: A History of the Bahamian People. Vol II. University of Georgia Press, 1998.
- Hank Messick, Lansky, Robert Hale & Company, 1971.
- Michael Newton. Mr. Mob: The Life and Crimes of Moe Dalitz. NC: McFarland & Co., 2007.
- Catherine Wismer, Sweethearts. Toronto: James Lorimer & Co., 1980.
- Douglas Valentine, The Strength of the Wolf: The Secret History of America's War on Drugs, Verso, 2004.
