= Hawksbill Creek Agreement =

Agreement between government

The Hawksbill Creek Agreement named in honour of the Hawksbill Sea Turtle was an agreement signed in 1955 between the government of the Bahamas and Wallace Groves to establish a city and free trade zone on Grand Bahama Island with an aim of spurring economic development in the area.

Groves was granted 50,000 acres (200 km²) of land with an option of adding 50,000 acres (200 km²). The Grand Bahama Port Authority was created to develop and administer the land and thus the city of Freeport was planned and built from scratch. To encourage investment, the agreement allowed the port authority not to pay taxes on income, capital gains, real estate, and private property until 1985—a provision that extended the agreement a further 49 years. This has since been extended to 2054.
