= Grand Bahama Port Authority =

Government agency of The Bahamas

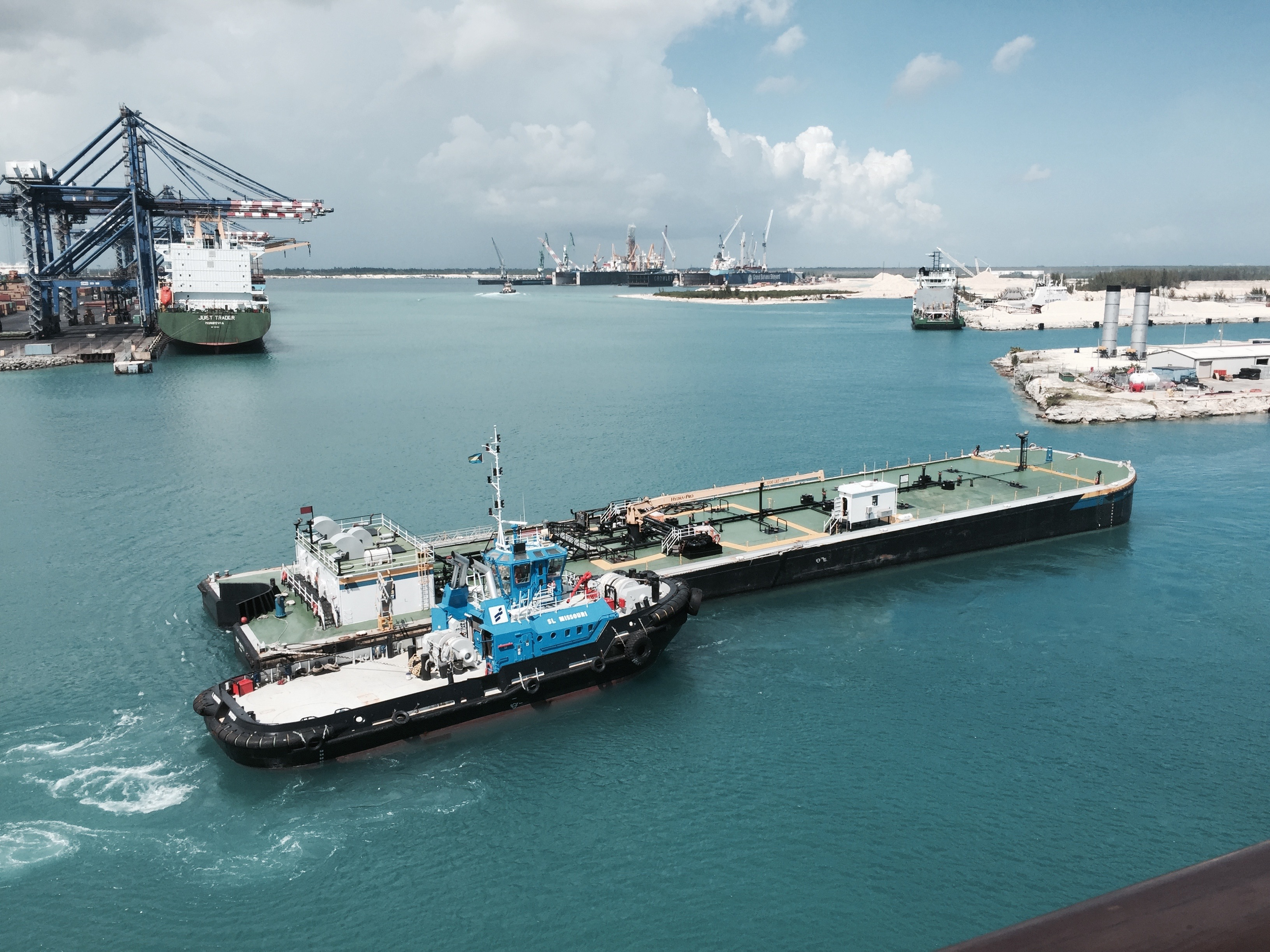
Tug and barge in Freeport Harbour, with container terminal and shipyards in background.

The Grand Bahama Port Authority (GBPA or "Port Authority") is a privately held corporation that also acts as the municipal authority for Freeport, Grand Bahama Island, The Bahamas. The GBPA was created by the Hawksbill Creek Agreement.

The GBPA is horizontally integrated with property development, municipal services, airport (world's largest privately owned airport) harbour operations, and shipyard concerns.

== Ownership Structure ==
The GBPA partners with Hutchison Whampoa on the container port (through Hutchison Port Holdings) and resort area at Lucaya. The Grand Bahama Port Authority is jointly owned by the Hayward and St. George families. Ian Rolle currently serves as President and Co - Chair of The Grand Bahama Port Authority.
