= Freeport, Bahamas =

Freeport
- City
- City of Freeport
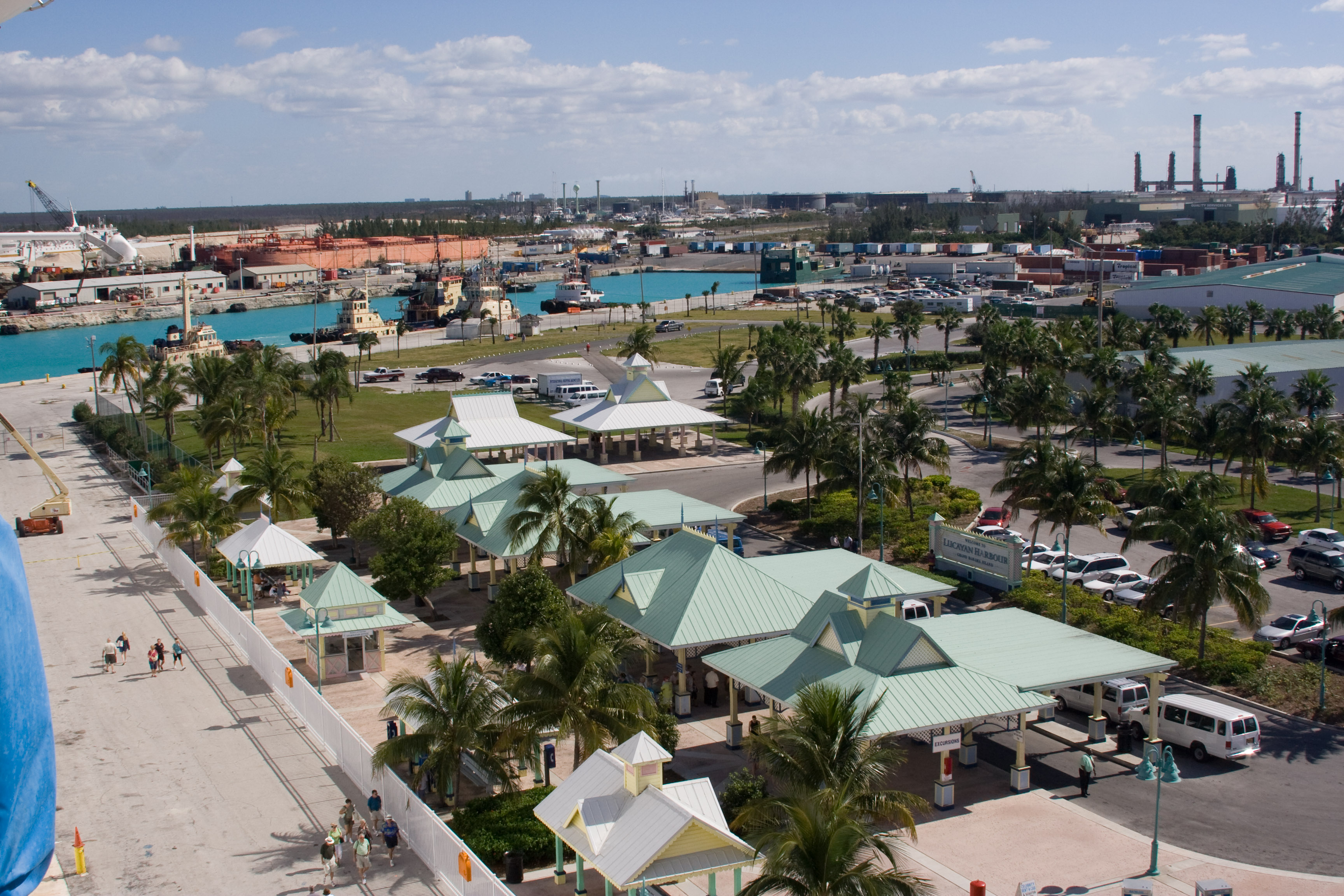
- Nicknames: The Industrial Capital; The Second City
- The city of Freeport highlighted in red in Bahamas

- Location within Bahamas
- Coordinates: 26°31′43″N 78°41′48″W
- Country: The Bahamas
- Island: Grand Bahama
- District: City of Freeport
- Established: August 4, 1955

Government
  - Type: District Council
  - Chief Councillor: Kendal Culmer
  - Deputy Chief Councillor: Ernie Barr

Area
  - City: 558 km^{2} (215 sq mi)
- Elevation: 10 m (33 ft)

Population (2000)
  - City: 26,914
  - Density: 48/km^{2} (120/sq mi)
  - Metro: 55,500
- Time zone: UTC-5 (Eastern Time Zone)
- Area code: 242
- IATA airport code: FPO
- ICAO airport code: MYGF
- Website: http://gbpa.com/home/

Freeport is a city, district and free trade zone on the island of Grand Bahama in the northwest part of The Bahamas. In 1955, Wallace Groves, a Virginian financier with lumber interests in Grand Bahama, was granted 20,000 hectares (50,000 acres) of pineyard with substantial areas of swamp and scrubland by the Bahamian government with a mandate to economically develop the area. Freeport has grown to become the second most populous city in The Bahamas.

The main airport serving the city is the Grand Bahama International Airport, which receives domestic flights from various islands of The Bahamas as well as several international flights from the United States, Italy, and Canada. Freeport is also served by domestic Bahamian ferry services to other islands, and an international ferry connection to Miami.

The Grand Bahama Port Authority (GBPA) operates the free trade zone, under the Hawksbill Creek Agreement signed in August 1955 whereby the Bahamian government agreed that businesses located in the Freeport area would pay no taxes before 1980, later extended to 2054. The area of the land grants within which the Hawksbill Creek Agreement applies has been increased to 56,000 hectares (138,000 acres).

== History ==
Freeport is a 600 km^{2} (230 sq mi) free trade zone on Grand Bahama Island, established in 1955 by the government of The Bahamas. The city of Freeport emerged from a land grant comprising 20,000 hectares (50,000 acres) of swamp and scrub to become a cosmopolitan centre.

The Grand Bahama Port Authority (GBPA) operates the free-trade zone, under special powers conferred by the government under the Hawksbill Creek Agreement, which was extended until August 3, 2054. The agreement also increased the land grants to 56,000 hectares (138,000 acres).

The Hayward and St. George families own the GBPA, which they have used to fund estates in Great Britain such as Dunmaglass, the purchase of the football club Wolverhampton Wanderers F.C., and to pay the multi-million dollar legal fees incurred due to disputes between the two families. Meanwhile, inheritance and contract disputes within the Hayward family has likewise incurred multi-million dollar fees. Bahamian politicians such as the FNM opposition leader Michael Pintard have described the legal dispute between the Haywards and St. Georges as damaging to Freeport's economy, while in March 2024 Prime Minister Philip Davis asserted that according to a PriceWaterhouseCoopers audit, the GBPA owes the Bahamian government US$357 million. As of August 2024, GBPA has not paid what the government of The Bahamas says is due.

The city was severely impacted by Hurricane Dorian, which stalled above Grand Bahama for 12 hours, caused storm surges between 12 and 18 feet above normal, killed eight people in Grand Bahama, and destroyed up to thirteen thousand homes.

== Geography ==
Freeport is located just 108 kilometres (67 mi) off the coast of Palm Beach, Florida, and on the major EW–NS shipping routes. This has positioned it as an ideal centre for international business. Consequently, a growing number of international companies use Freeport as a business site.

=== National parks ===
Parks include the Rand Nature Centre, named after its founder James Rand; Petersons Cay, a small isle about 300 yards off the shore of Grand Bahama; and the Lucayan National Park founded by Peter Barratt, a former architect and town planner of Freeport. The Lucayan National Park is 16 hectares (40 acres) in extent and includes five ecological zones stretching from the south shore to the pineyard. There is an extensive underwater cave system beneath the park. One cave entrance is accessible by stairs at the national park, while other caves are accessible for certified scubas.

== Climate ==
Freeport features a tropical monsoon climate (Am) under the Köppen climate classification. Seldom do temperatures drop below 16 °C (60 °F). Average temperatures are around 27 °C (80 °F), with water temperature varying between 22 and 26 °C (72 and 78 °F). The winters are usually mild and dry (with the exception of some rainfall due to cold fronts), while the summers are usually hot and wet. Although a freeze has never been reported in The Bahamas, snow was reported to have mixed with rain in Freeport in January 1977 the same time that it snowed in the Miami area. The temperature was about 4.5 °C (40.1 °F) at the time. The temperature of 4.5 °C (40.1 °F) was tied, on 30 January 2022. The all time record high of 36.7 °C (98.1 °F) was set on 15 August 2026, which is also the Bahamas' all time record high.

Climate data for Freeport (1971-2000)
Month	Jan	Feb	Mar	Apr	May	Jun	Jul	Aug	Sep	Oct	Nov	Dec	Year
Mean daily maximum °C (°F)	24.3 (75.8)	24.4 (75.9)	25.8 (78.4)	27.4 (81.3)	29.7 (85.4)	31.2 (88.2)	32.2 (90.0)	32.3 (90.2)	31.7 (89.0)	29.7 (85.4)	27.3 (81.2)	25.1 (77.2)	28.4 (83.2)
Mean daily minimum °C (°F)	15.9 (60.7)	15.6 (60.0)	17.5 (63.5)	19.2 (66.6)	21.1 (69.9)	23.2 (73.8)	23.9 (75.1)	23.9 (75.1)	23.3 (74.0)	21.4 (70.5)	19.4 (66.9)	17.0 (62.6)	20.1 (68.2)
Average precipitation mm (inches)	83.1 (3.27)	72.6 (2.86)	93.5 (3.68)	66.8 (2.63)	104.7 (4.12)	176.0 (6.93)	165.4 (6.51)	207.8 (8.18)	217.4 (8.56)	142.8 (5.62)	93.0 (3.66)	73.7 (2.90)	1,496.8 (58.92)
Average rainy days	10	9	9	7	12	17	18	19	19	16	11	10	157
Mean monthly sunshine hours	217	226	279	270	279	270	279	279	240	248	210	217	3,014
Mean daily sunshine hours	7	8	9	9	9	9	9	9	8	8	7	7	8
Percentage possible sunshine	65	71	75	70	67	65	66	69	65	70	65	67	68
Average ultraviolet index	5	7	9	10	11	11	11	11	10	8	6	5	9
Source 1: WMO
Source 2: Weather Atlas (rain days, sun, and uv)

== Economy ==
Tourism draws more than 1 million visitors per year, but has diminished since 2004, when major hurricanes Hurricane Frances and Hurricane Jeanne made landfall; in 2016, Hurricane Matthew hit the island. In early September 2019, Hurricane Dorian moved over the area and stalled for over a day, causing extensive devastation. Several cruise ships stop weekly at the island. Much of the tourist industry is centered on the seaside suburb of Lucaya, owing its name to the pre-Columbian Lucayan inhabitants of the island evidence of whom has been found on the island. Freeport features at least two Junkanoo festivals near New Year's.

The city is often promoted as Freeport/Lucaya. Most hotels on the island are located in Lucaya along the southern shore facing the Northwest Providence Channel. The primary shopping venue for tourists is the Port Lucaya Marketplace in Lucaya. Recovery from the 2004 Hurricanes Jeanne and Frances took nearly a decade and led to closure of the older shopping venue International Bazaar and neighboring Bahamas Princess Resort and Casino.

== Governance ==
For elections to the Parliament of the Bahamas, Freeport is part of the Marco City constituency.

== Transport ==
=== Air ===
Grand Bahama International Airport is main airport serving the island, which receives domestic flights from various islands of The Bahamas as well as several international flights from the United States and Canada.

=== Water ===
Ferries provide domestic inter-island transportation within The Bahamas, as well as an international passenger ferry connection to Port Everglades in Fort Lauderdale, operated by Baleària using the high-speed passenger catamaran, HSC Jaume II.

The Grand Bahama Port Authority operates the main port in the city.

== Notable natives and residents ==
- Janine Antoni - conceptual artist
- Robert Antoni - novelist, professor
- Sebastian Bach - Canadian singer, frontman of the band Skid Row
- JoBeth Coleby-Davis - Bahamian Progressive Liberal Party politician, attorney
- Andre Deveaux - NHL player
- Joanna Evans - Olympian Swimmer
- Tynia Gaither - sprint Olympian
- Jeffery Gibson - 400mH world champ medalist & Olympian
- Shavez Hart - sprint Olympian
- Jack Hayward - British businessman
- Raymond Higgs - Olympian Jumper
- Buddy Hield - NBA player
- Jonquel Jones - WNBA player
- Johnny Kemp- Singer/Songwriter
- Justin Hill - British writer
- Michael Mathieu - sprint Olympic medalist
- Demetrius Pinder - sprint Olympic medalist
- Mate Pavić - Croatian professional tennis player
- Vasek Pospisil - Canadian professional tennis player
- Magnum Rolle - NBA Player
- Alonzo Russell - sprint Olympian medalist
- Nivea Smith - Sprint athlete
- Teray Smith - Sprint Olympian
- Michael Strachan - NFL player
- Donald Thomas - high jump world champion and Olympian
- Andrae Williams - sprint Olympic medalist
- LaToy Williams - sprint athlete
- Chavez Young - baseball player

== Twin towns – sister cities ==
Freeport is twin towns and sister cities with Lucaya

- Concord, North Carolina, United States, since 2019
- Newark, New Jersey, United States, since 1990

== Gallery ==
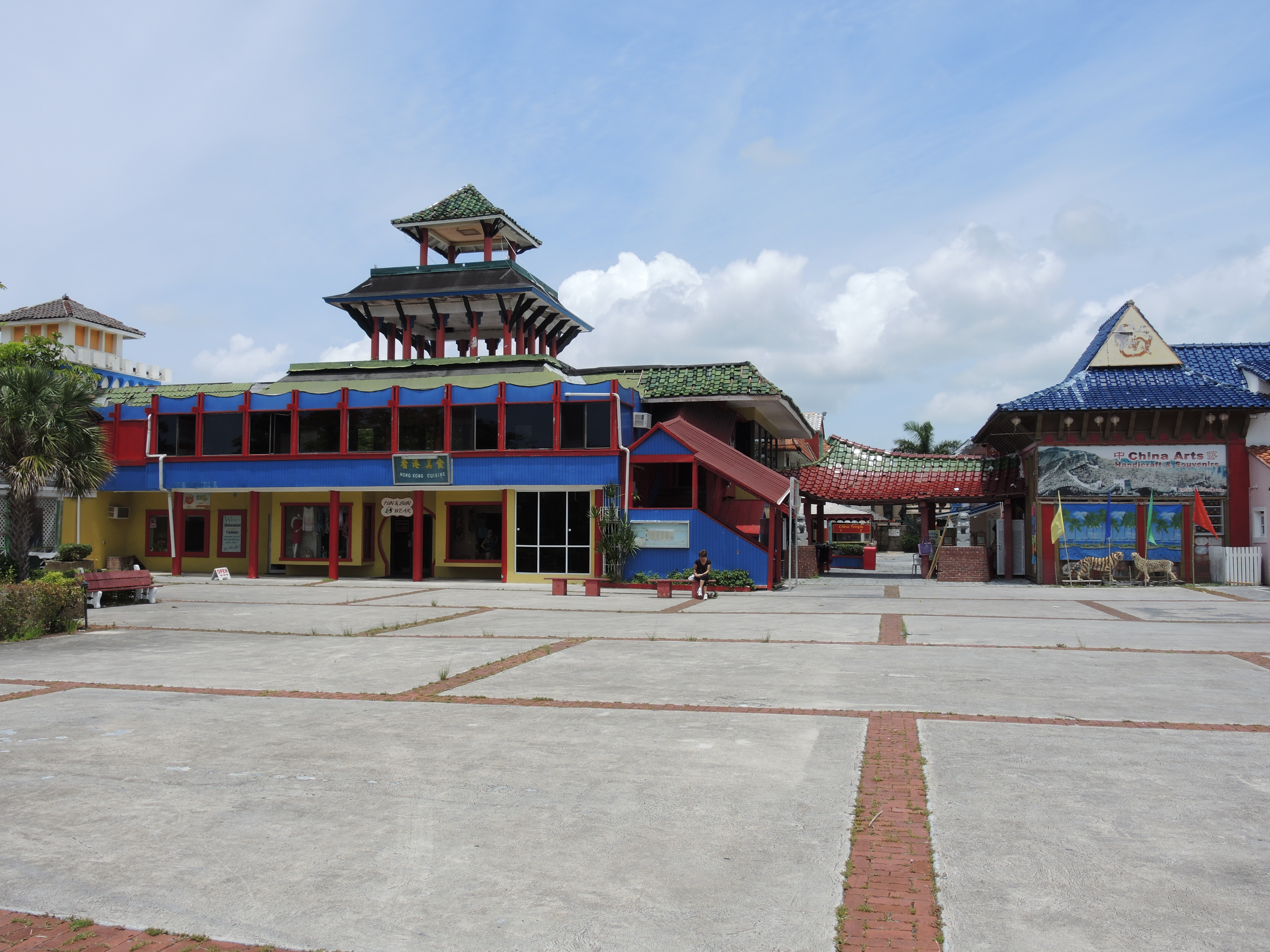
The International Bazaar

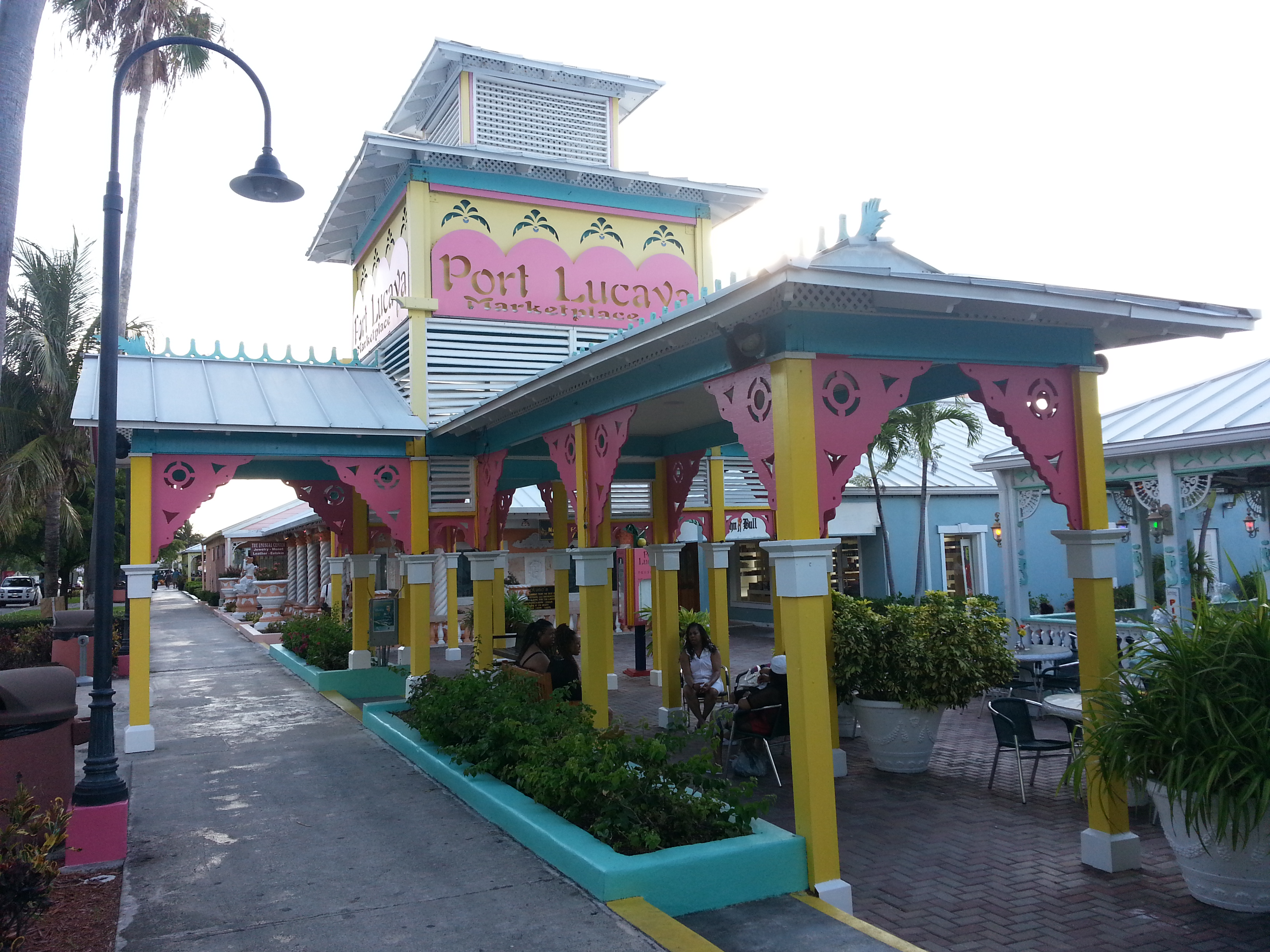
Port Lucaya Marketplace

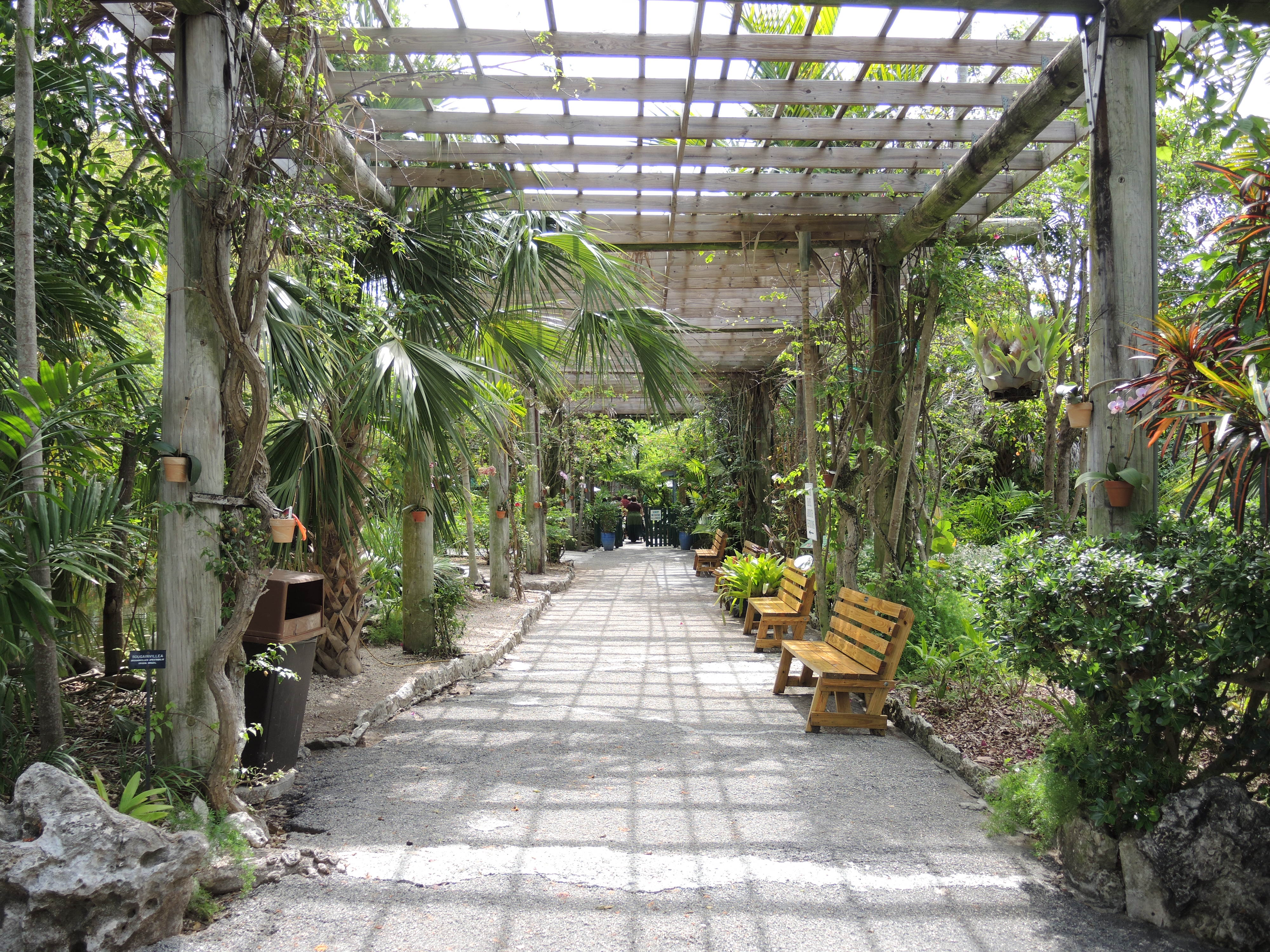
The Garden of the Groves

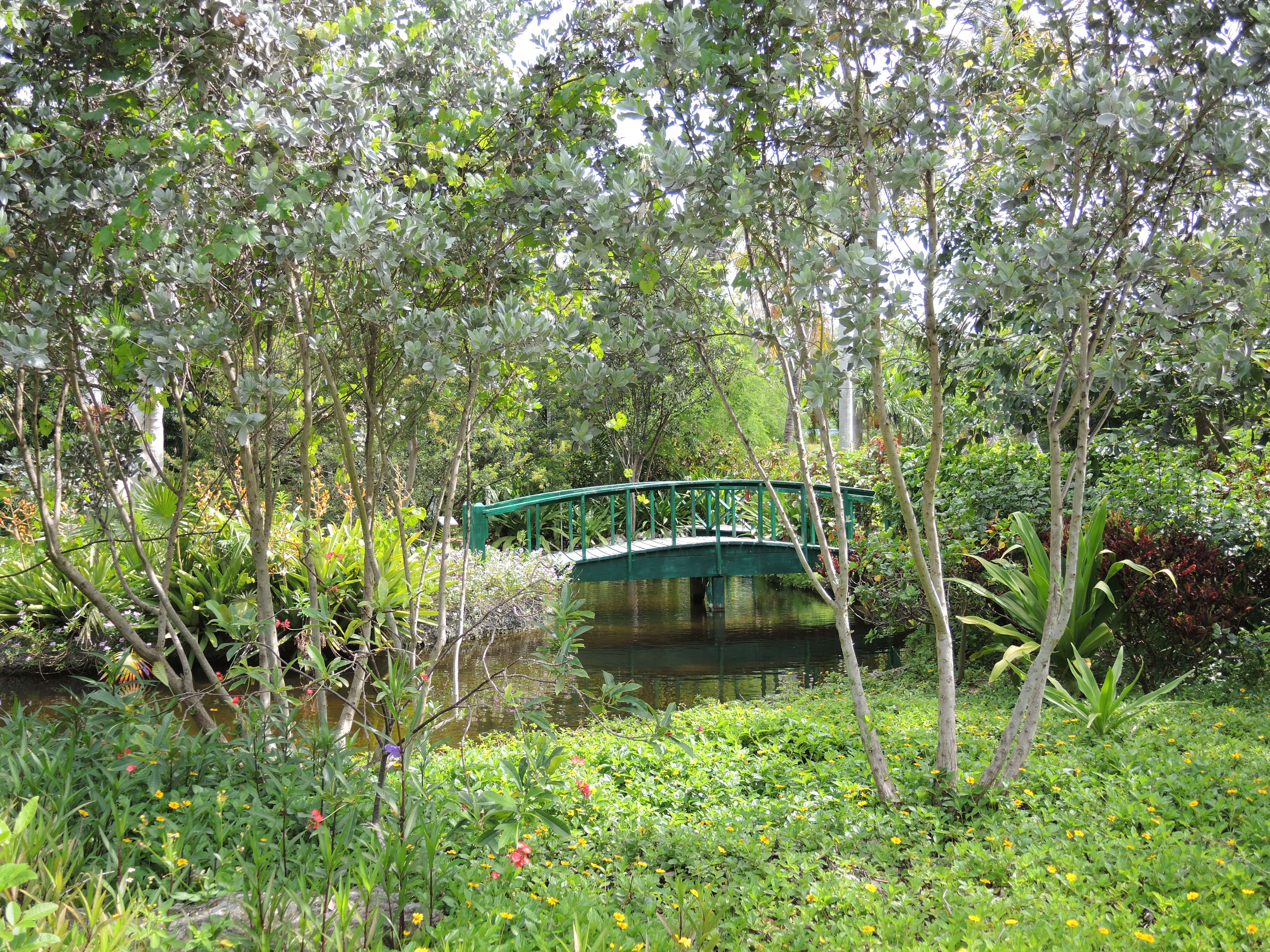
Bridge in the Garden of the Groves

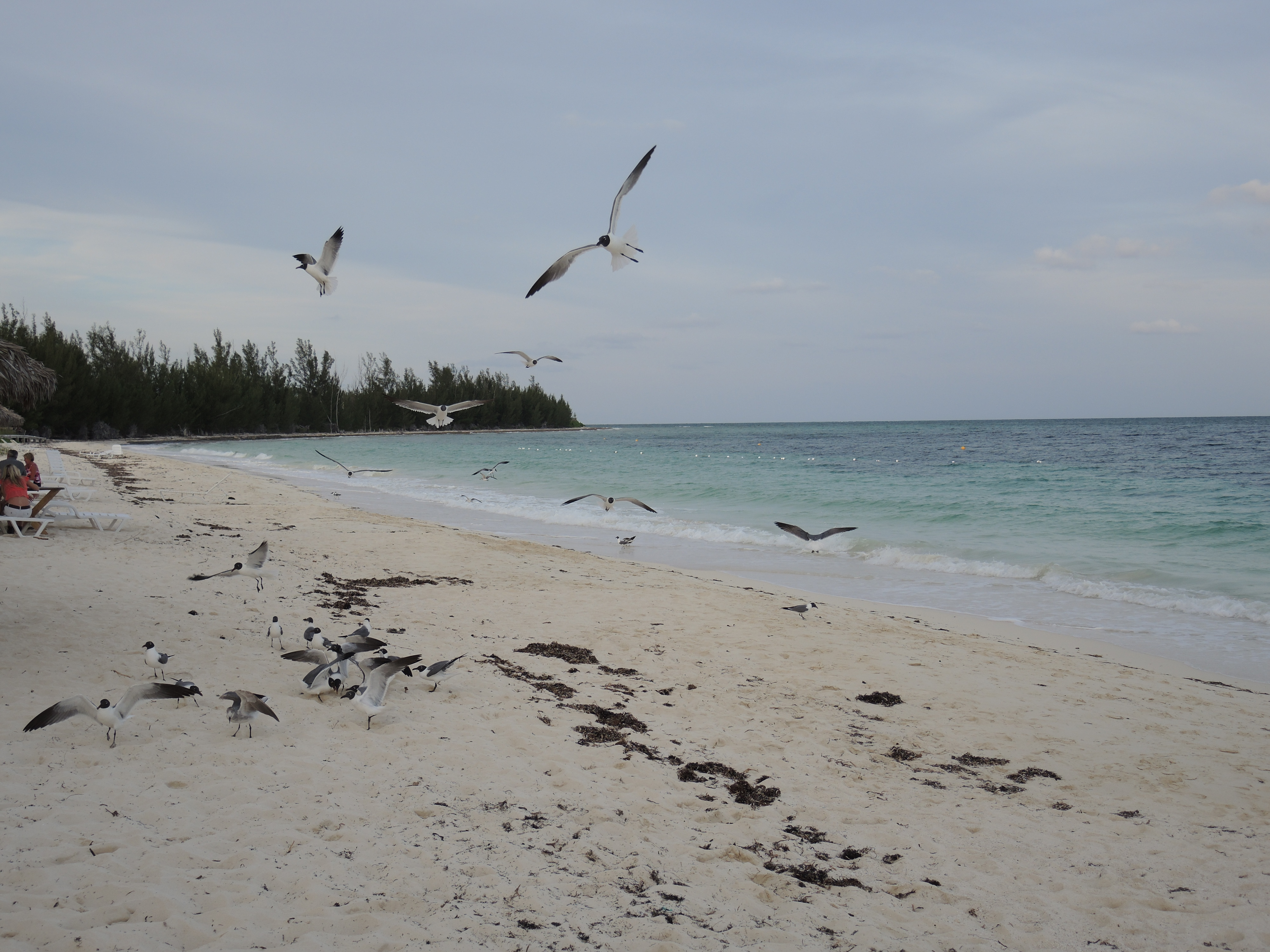
Seagulls at Taino Beach

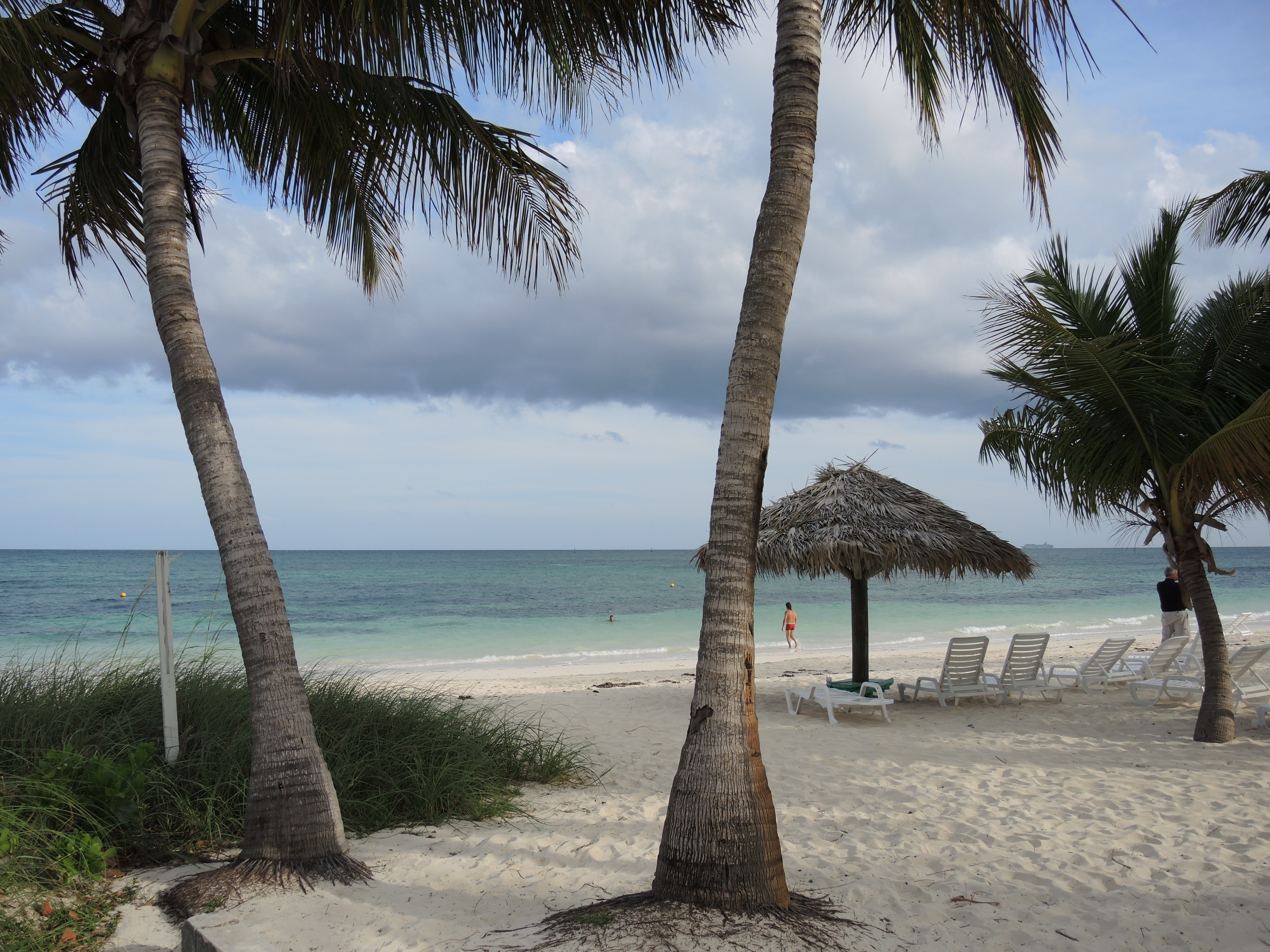
Taino Beach

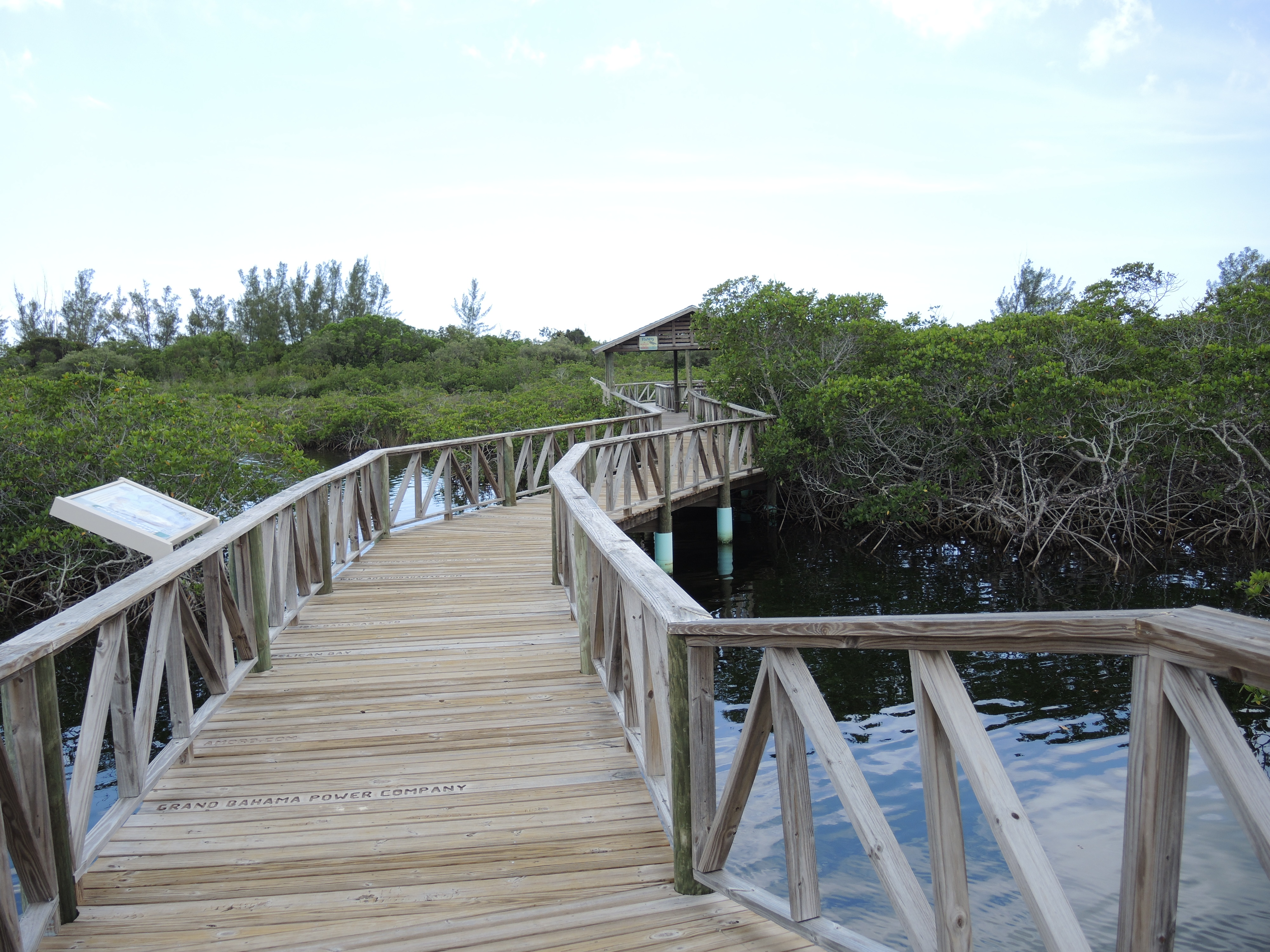
Boardwalk at Lucayan National Park

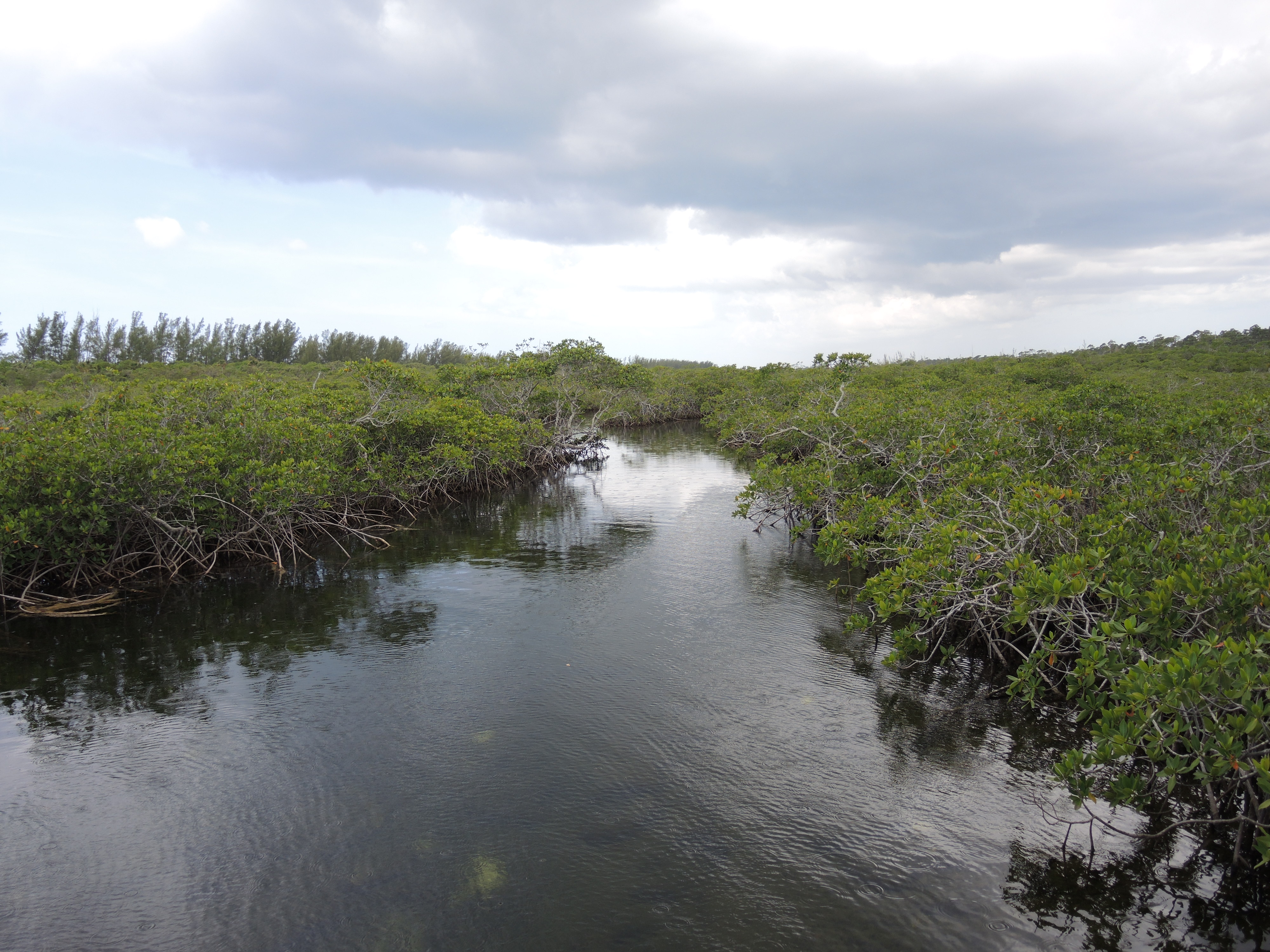
Lucayan National Park

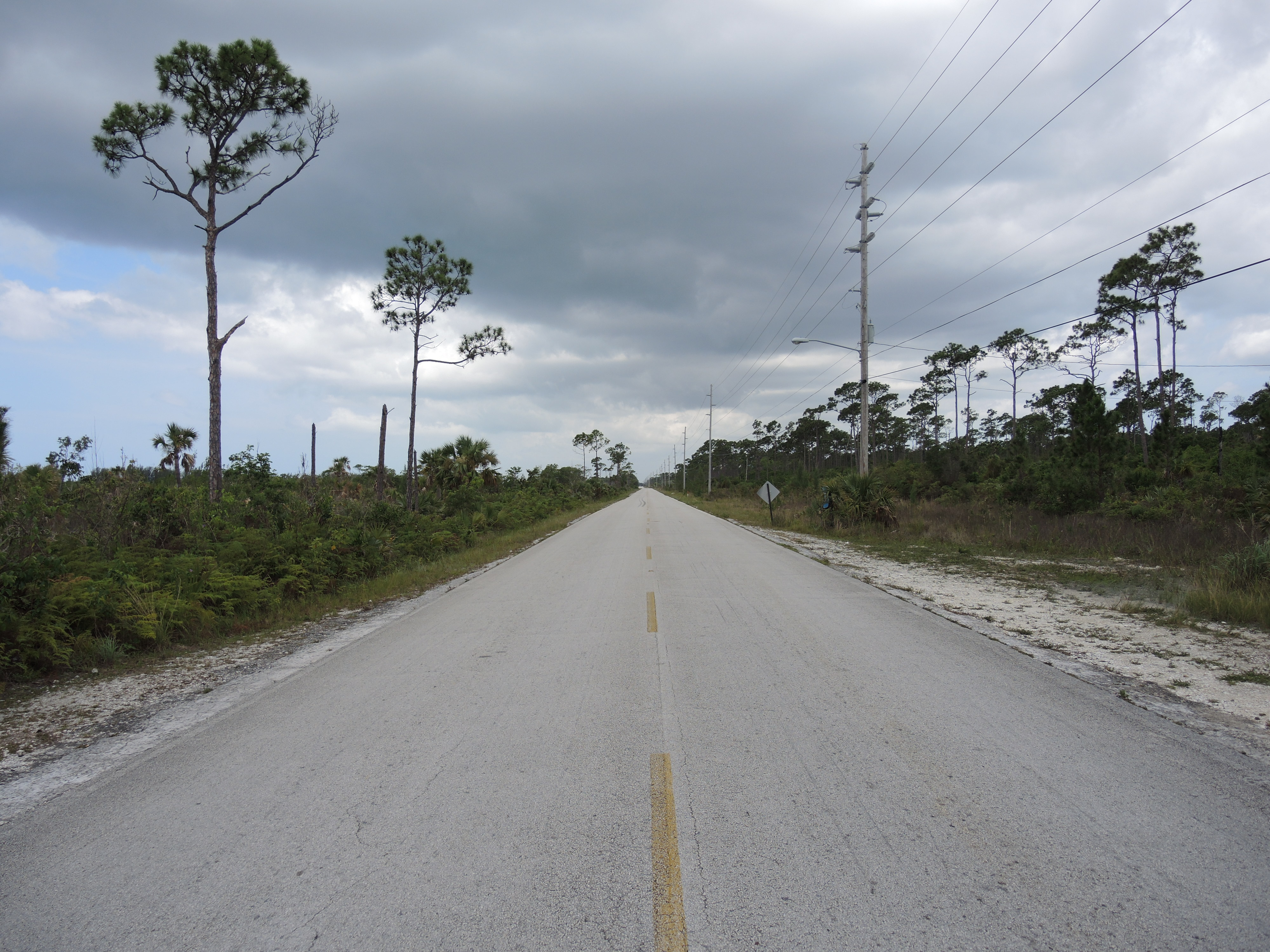
Grand Bahama Highway

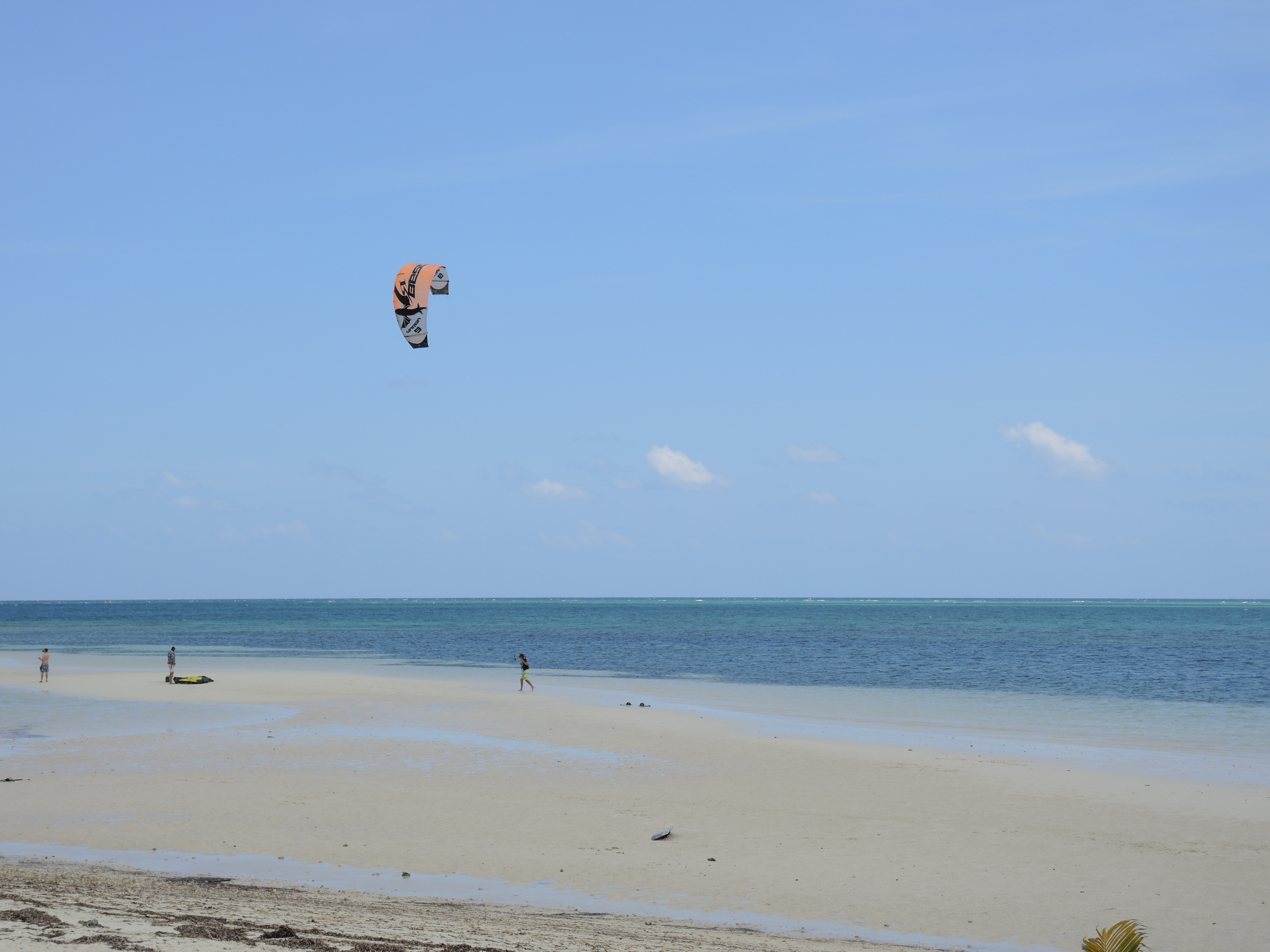
Kitesurf at Banana Bay

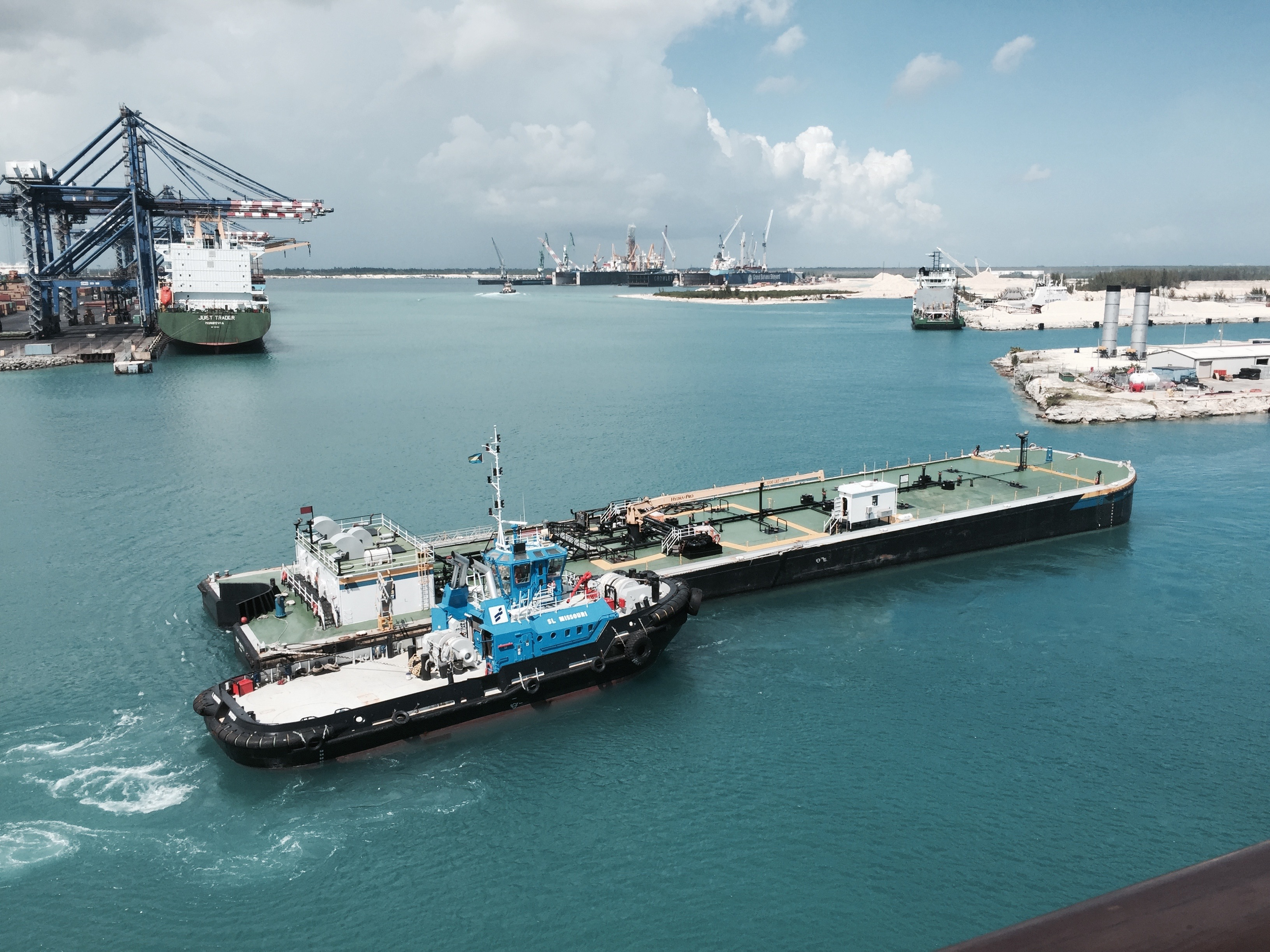
Freeport Harbor

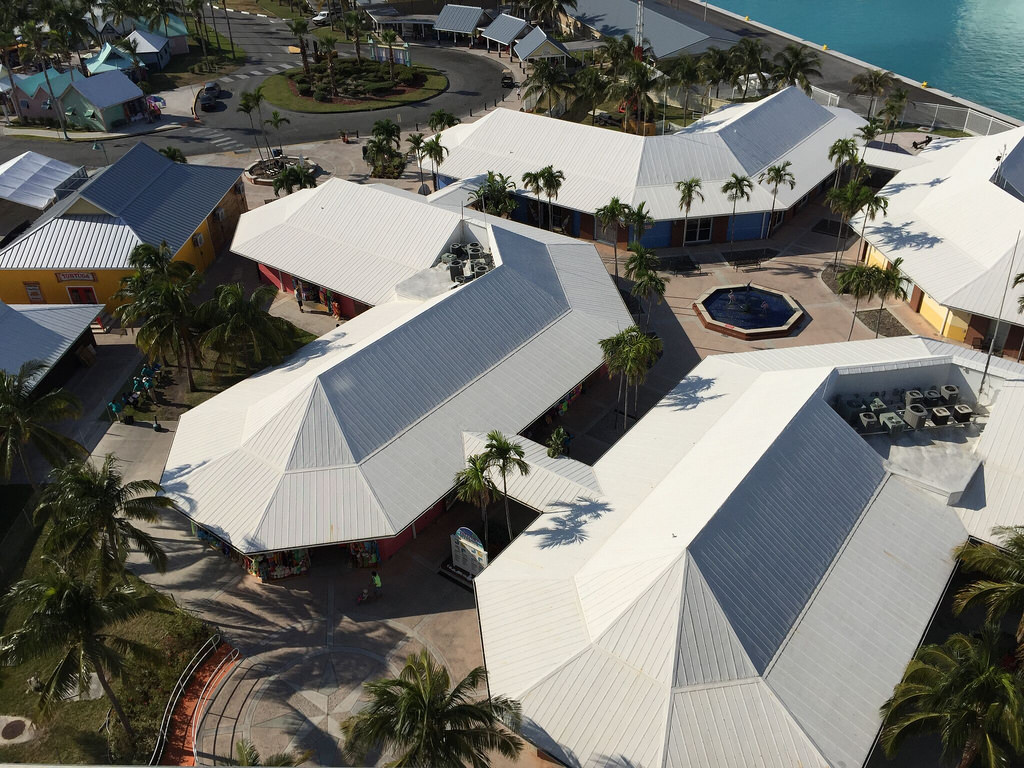
Freeport Cruise Ship Terminal

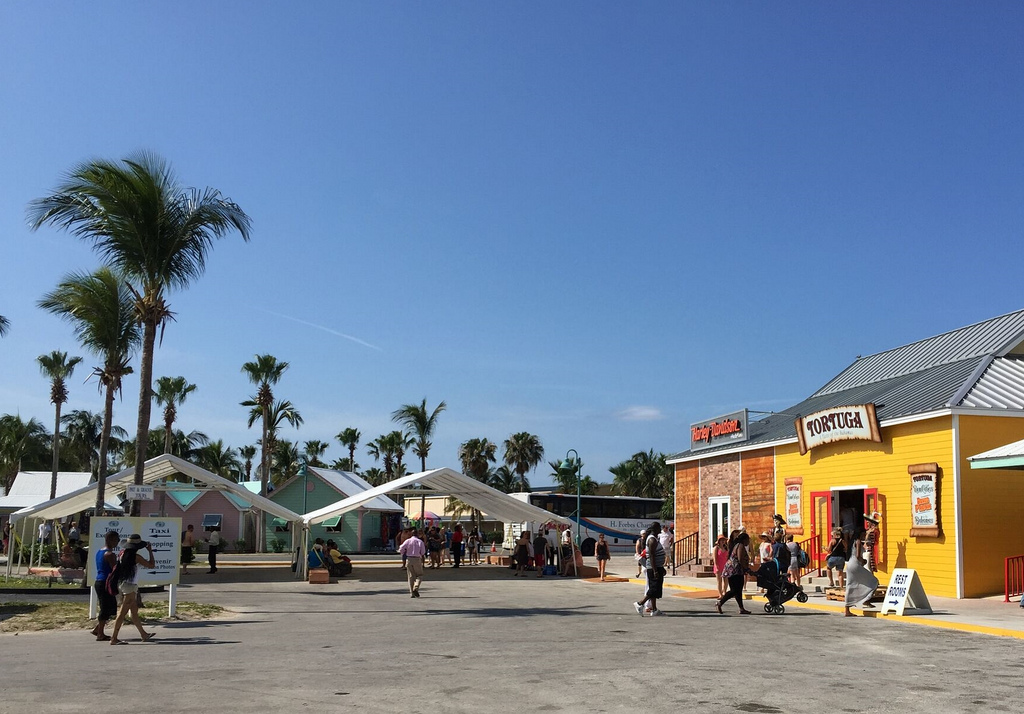
Freeport Cruise Terminal Shops

== See also ==
- Mary Star of the Sea Church, Freeport
