= Grand Bahama =

Island

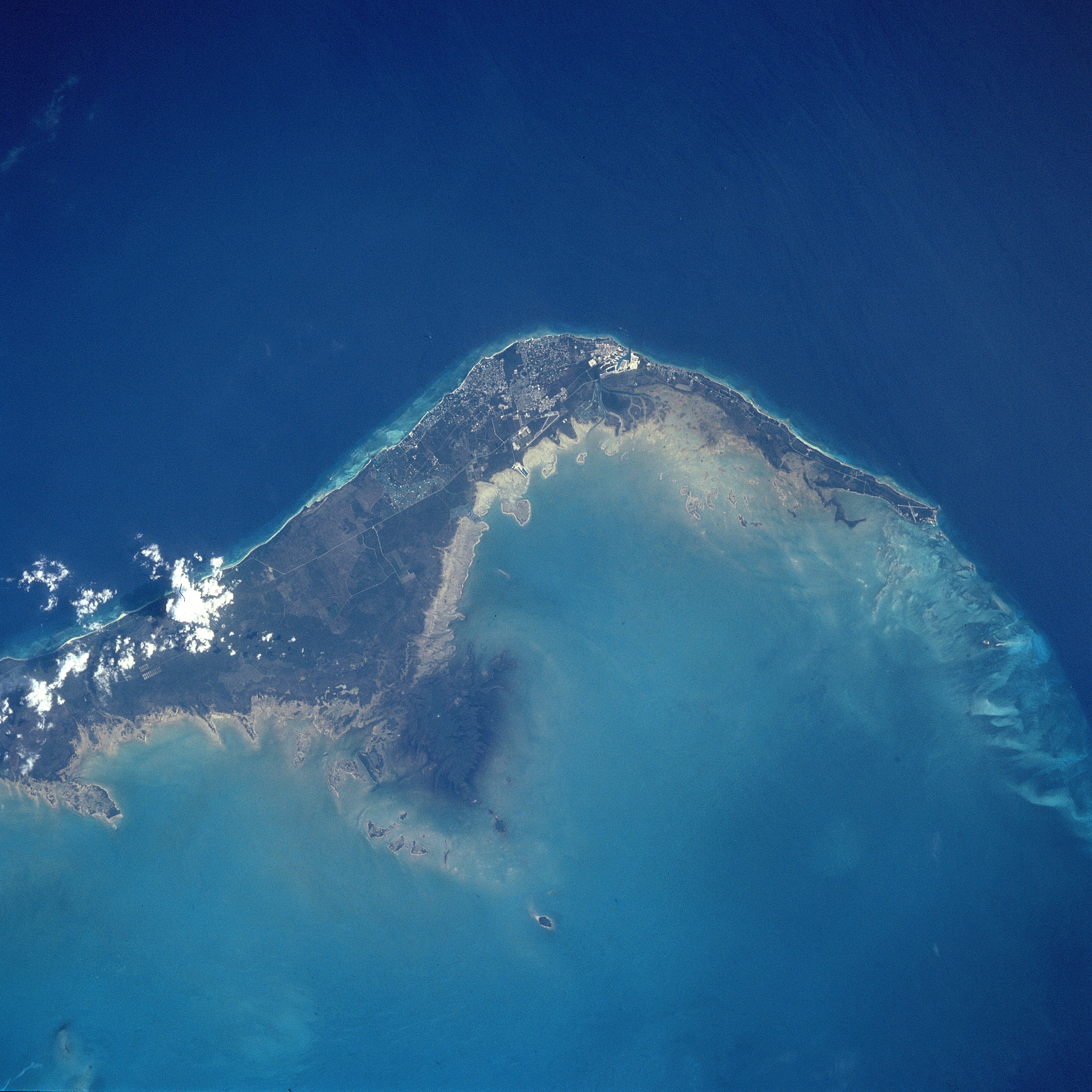
- Western and central Grand Bahama seen from space

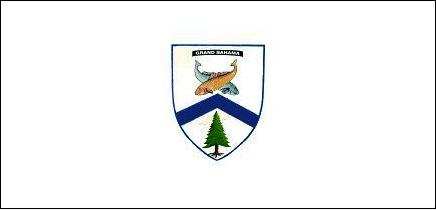
- Shield of Grand Bahama

- Location within Bahamas

Geography
- Location: Atlantic Ocean
- Coordinates: 26°39′N 78°19′W
- Archipelago: Bahamas
- Area: 1,373 km^{2} (530 sq mi)
- Highest elevation: 40 ft (12 m)

Administration
- Bahamas
- Largest settlement: Freeport

Demographics
- Population: 47,475 (2022)
- Pop. density: 34.75/km^{2} (90/sq mi)

Additional information
- Time zone: EST (UTC-5)
  - Summer (DST): EDT (UTC-4)
- ISO code: BS-EG; BS-FP; BS-WG

Grand Bahama is the northernmost of the islands of the Bahamas. It is the third largest island in the Bahamas island chain of approximately 700 islands and 2,400 cays. The island is roughly 530 square miles (1,400 km^{2}) in area and approximately 153 kilometres (95 miles) long west to east and 24 kilometres (15 miles) at its widest point north to south. Its westernmost town, West End, is located 56 nautical miles (64 miles; 104 km) east of Palm Beach, Florida. Administratively, the island consists of the Freeport Bonded Area and the districts of East Grand Bahama and West Grand Bahama. Nearly half of the homes on the island were damaged or destroyed in early September 2019 by Hurricane Dorian.

== Climate ==
Grand Bahama Island has a mix of tropical monsoon climate (Am) and tropical savanna climate (Aw), consisting of a hot, rainy season from May through October, and a warm, dry season from November through April.

In Freeport, the summer high temperatures average 31 °C (88 °F), and low temperatures average 26 °C (79 °F). During the winter, the average high temperature is 28 °C (82 °F), and the average low is 19 °C (66 °F). The hurricane season lasts from June through November, but the risk of hurricanes is highest during the months of August, September, and October.

== History ==
=== Early Spanish contact ===
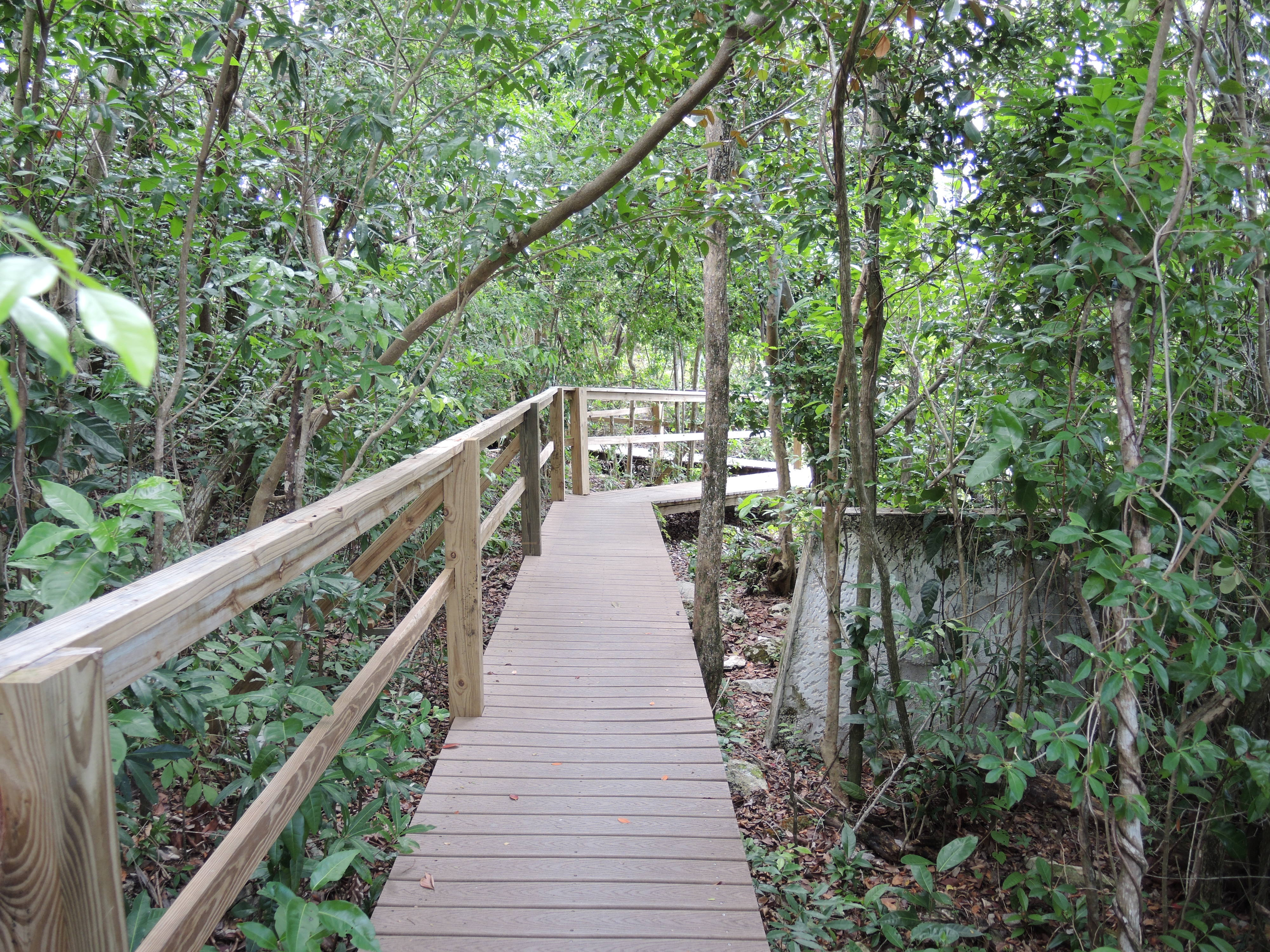
Lucayan National Park

The Indigenous Lucayan people's name for the island was Bahama ('large upper middle island'). Grand Bahama's existence for almost two centuries was largely governed by the nature of the treacherous coral reefs surrounding the island, which repelled its Spanish claimants (who largely left it alone apart from infrequent en route stops by ships for provisions) while attracting pirates, who would lure ships onto the reefs where they would run aground and be plundered. The Spaniards took little interest in the island after enslaving the native Lucayan inhabitants.

=== British rule ===
In 1670, Charles II of England issued a land patent, granting The Bahamas to the eight Lords Proprietors of the Carolinas. By 1828, Grand Bahama remained almost unpopulated.

A brief smuggling boom occurred during the years of prohibition in the United States, when West End, Grand Bahama, and Bimini served as waystations for illicit imports of liquor to the U.S.

The first major resort and the first commercial airport on Grand Bahama was developed at West End in the late 1940s by the British Butlin's firm, which constructed a 1000-guest resort from scratch, including building West End Airport. Butlin's ran the partially-completed facility for a single season (1950) before running out of money. A small part of the resort re-opened in the 1955 and more fundamental redevelopment occurred in 1960. West End Airport remained the main commercial airport for Grand Bahama until overshadowed by the newer airport at Freeport in the 1960s.

The major settlement that developed on the island was Freeport-Lucaya, but other hamlets and settlements emerged, including Russell Town, Williams Town, Smith's Point, Mather Town, Pinder's Point, Lewis Yard, Hunter's, and Mack Town.

=== Hawksbill Creek Agreement era ===
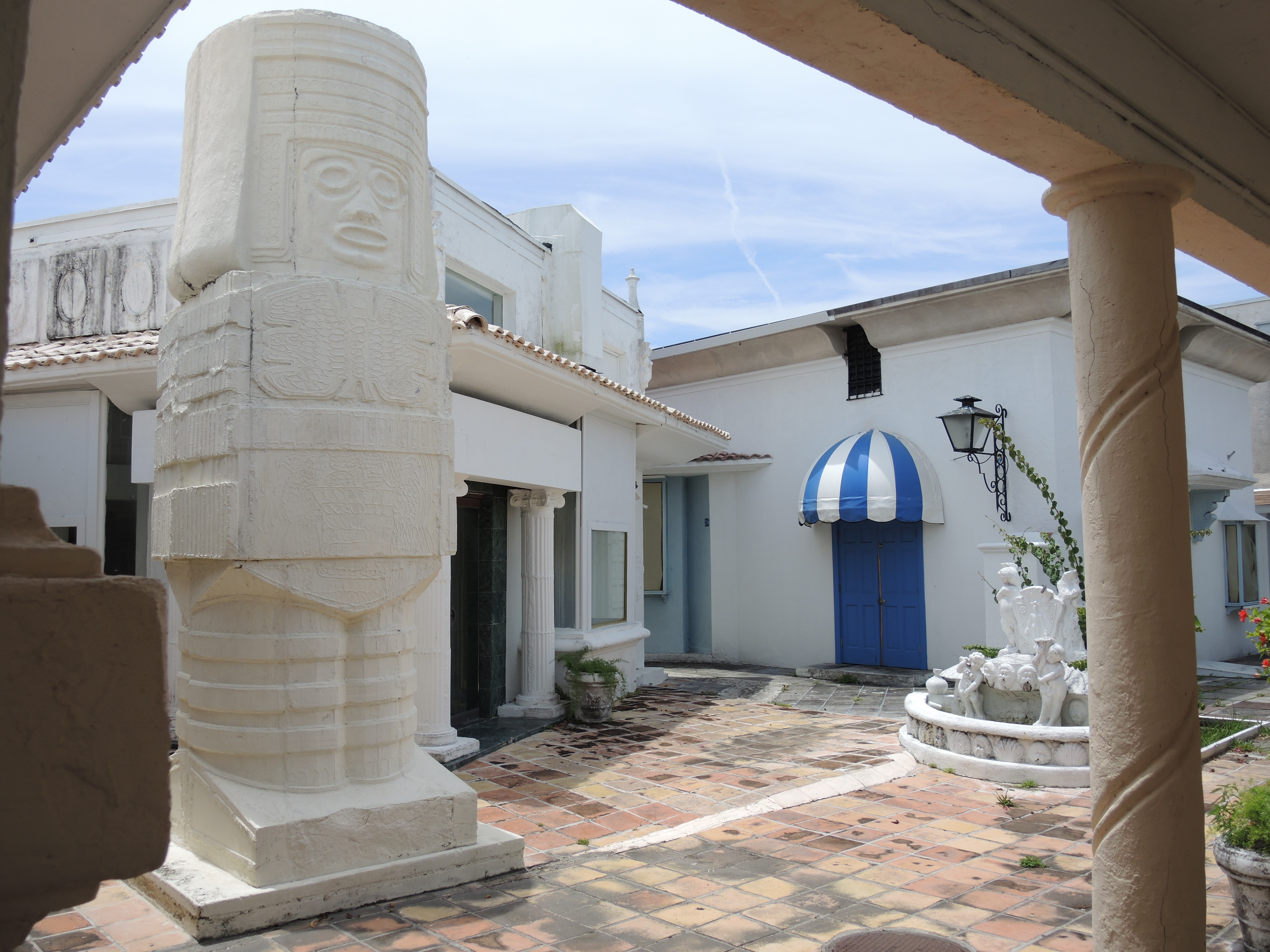
The International Bazaar in Freeport

By the mid-20th century, Grand Bahama's population numbered around 500 and the island was one of the least developed of the islands of The Bahamas. However it finally gained a stable source of income when in 1955 a Virginian financier named Wallace Groves began redevelopment with the Bahamian government to build the city of Freeport under the Hawksbill Creek Agreement and create the Grand Bahama Port Authority. Soon after, the ambitious Edward St. George, with the financial help of Sir Jack Hayward, took the company to new frontiers. Seeing the success of Cuba as a tourist destination for wealthy Americans, St. George was eager to develop Grand Bahama in a similar vein. The city grew rapidly as St. George added a harbour, an airport soon after the city was founded, and the tourist center of Port Lucaya in 1962. Grand Bahama became the second most populous island in The Bahamas (over 50,000 in 2004).

=== Hurricane Dorian effects ===
On September 1, 2019, Hurricane Dorian struck the island as a Category 5 hurricane and caused catastrophic destruction.

== Economy ==
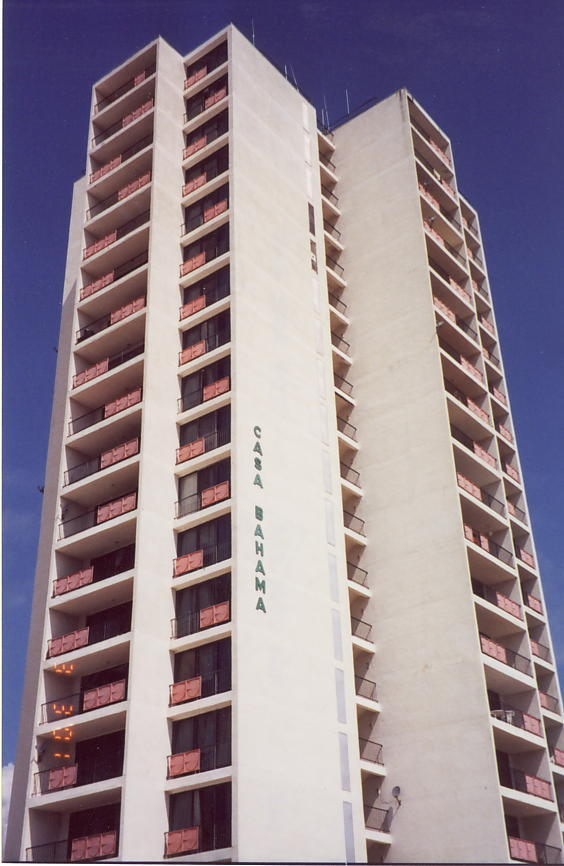
Casa Bahama, an 18-storey condominium, the tallest building in Grand Bahama

Exports and imports are essential to the economy of The Bahamas. The country is the 137th largest exporter and 117th largest importer in the world. Its major trading partners include the United States, France, and Finland. Top exports include passenger cargo ships, special purpose ships, and refined petroleum. Freeport, a city in Grand Bahama, has some industries that directly contribute to The Bahamas' exports. These major industries are pharmaceutical plants, the Fragrance of The Bahamas perfume factory, an oil transshipment company, and an immunology research center. Agriculture and fisheries are also economically important. Bahamian farms produce crops, poultry, livestock, and dairy. On commercial farms in Grand Bahama, vegetables and citrus fruits are produced and exported to other countries. From Bahamian fisheries, crayfish and conch are the top exports.

Even more than the production of goods, tourism is the mainstay of Grand Bahama's economy. The resort area at Port Lucaya and visits by cruise ships provide the bulk of this activity. Grand Bahama's tourism sector is directly supported by some of its industry: the BORCO oil bunkering facility owned by Buckeye, the South Riding Point oil storage and transhipment terminal owned by Statoil, and a transshipment/container port partly owned by Hong Kong conglomerate Hutchison Whampoa and the Grand Bahama Port Authority. There are also quarrying operations and a large shipyard on the island.

Grand Bahama has two airports, Grand Bahama International Airport in Freeport and West End Airport in West End. Grand Bahama International Airport is the larger of the two, and West End Airport is open sporadically for private aircraft only.

== Administrative regions ==
Grand Bahama is divided into three districts and seven town areas for administrative purposes. Each district is run by a chief councilor, and each town area or township is run by a chairperson. As of 1996 Grand Bahama has three districts:

- East Grand Bahama
- West Grand Bahama
- The City of Freeport

Elections are held every 5 years in The Bahamas. The two principal parties are the Progressive Liberal Party and the Free National Movement.. Grand Bahama also is a part of the islands outside of New Providence and operate under Local Government; this allows for a greater allowance for people to have a more direct rule. The intention of Local government is to not have direct connections to any political party.

== Main settlements ==
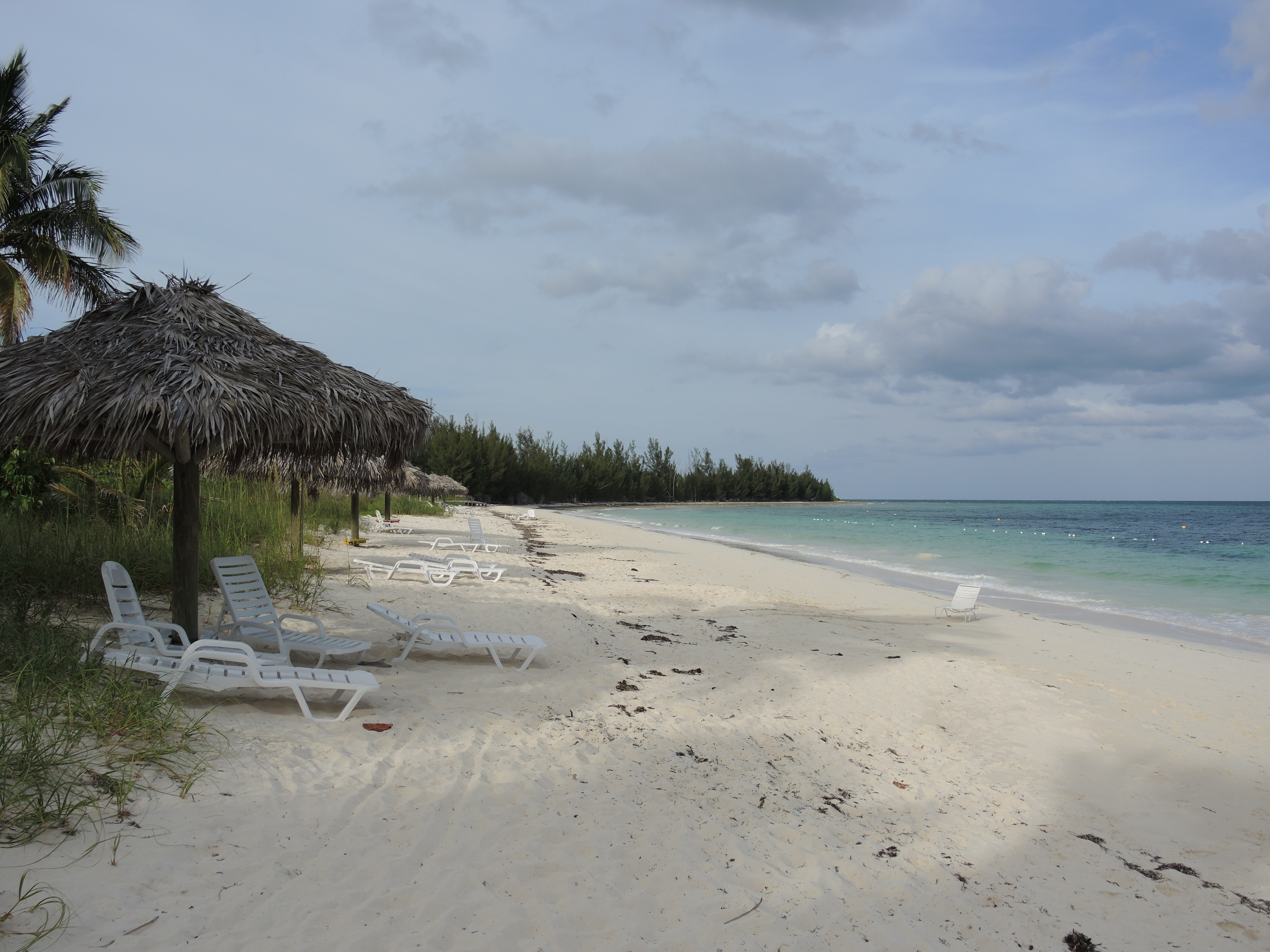
Taino Beach

- Freeport is the main city of Grand Bahama. It holds the commercial ship harbour and the main airport.
- Lucaya is a tourist destination on the island, with beaches and hotels.
- West End is the capital of Grand Bahama. It first achieved notoriety as a rum-running port during the Prohibition.

In the 1950s, West End became home to the Jack Tar marina and club. However, over the years the marina fell into disrepair, and the whole city of West End was of little economic import to Grand Bahama. In 2001, the resort was reopened as Old Bahama Bay Resort & Yacht Harbour.

- Eight Mile Rock stretches out over eight miles of rocky shore, hence its name. It is home to Bahamian NBA and WNBA players, Buddy Hield and Jonquel Jones.
- McLean's Town is the easternmost settlement of Grand Bahama. It is within a 30-minute ferry ride of the northernmost settlement, the neighboring island of Abaco.

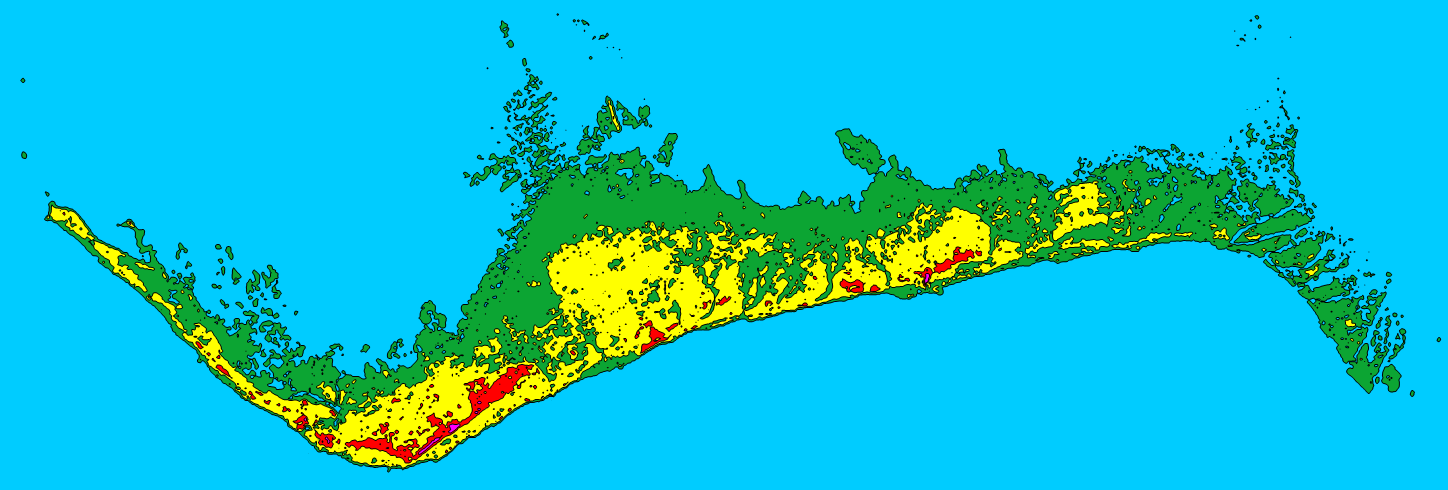
Topographic map of Grand Bahama Island

== Flora and fauna ==
Grand Bahama Island is populated with a variety of plants, birds, mammals and fish.

The Bahamas is home to many different species of bats, including the buffy flower bat, whose hair is white and brown. As the name suggests, it has a flowery nose that helps pollinate flowers and is usually found in dark caves or abandoned homes.

The Bahama woodstar is a non-migratory hummingbird found in brushy habitats, including forest and undergrowth, areas of low-growing, and scrubby vegetation.

The Bahama swallow is a medium-sized bird native to The Bahamas. This endangered bird breeds in the islands' pine woodland, but is threatened due to human development. This swallow has a green head and back, blue wings with a black tail, and a white belly and chin.

The tiger shark is a species that gets its name from the vertical stripes that line its body. They are often found near canals, harbours and shallow reefs of Grand Bahama Island.

The yellow elder is a shrub native to The Bahamas. It is densely branched with bright green leaves and yellow flowers that usually attract butterflies, bees, and hummingbirds.

The casuarina is an invasive species to The Bahamas. It is a flowering shrub or tree with fine leaves that can grow to a height of 65 feet. The casuarina is common along the islands' shorelines, due to its salt-tolerance and ability to thrive in sandy soils.
