= Lucaya, Bahamas =

Lucaya
- City
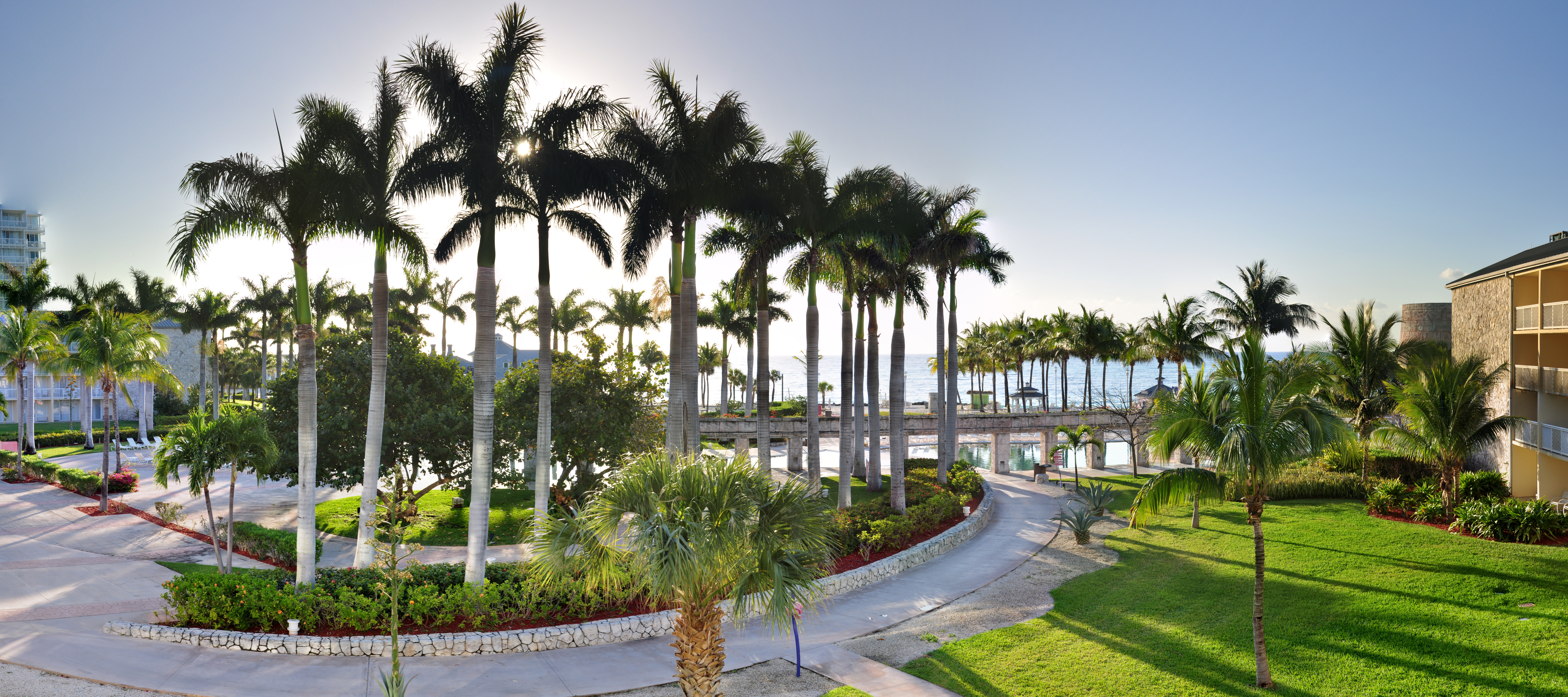
- Reef Village at Our Lucaya

- Location within Bahamas
- Coordinates: 26°30′42″N 78°38′35″W
- Country: Bahamas
- Island: Grand Bahama
- District: Freeport

Population (April 2023)
  - Total: 46,525
  - Density: 41.22/km^{2} (106.8/sq mi)
- Time zone: UTC-5 (Eastern Time Zone)

Lucaya is a suburb of Freeport, Bahamas, a city on the island of Grand Bahama, approximately 105 mi (160 km) east-northeast of Fort Lauderdale, Florida, together with Freeport it forms the second largest city in the Bahamas. Lucaya's primary industry is tourism.

Major hotels and attractions in the resort are the Our Lucaya resort, which includes both The Radisson and Reef Village properties, Pelican Bay Hotel and the UNEXSO (UNderwater EXplorers SOciety) dive charter operation.

UNEXSO was the first destination dive charter business in the world and now features a dolphinarium as well as a variety of SCUBA diving charters including shark feeding dives.

Port Lucaya is a popular spring break destination with the socializing centering on Count Basie Square.

== See also ==
- Lucaya International School
- Albert Tillman

== Gallery ==
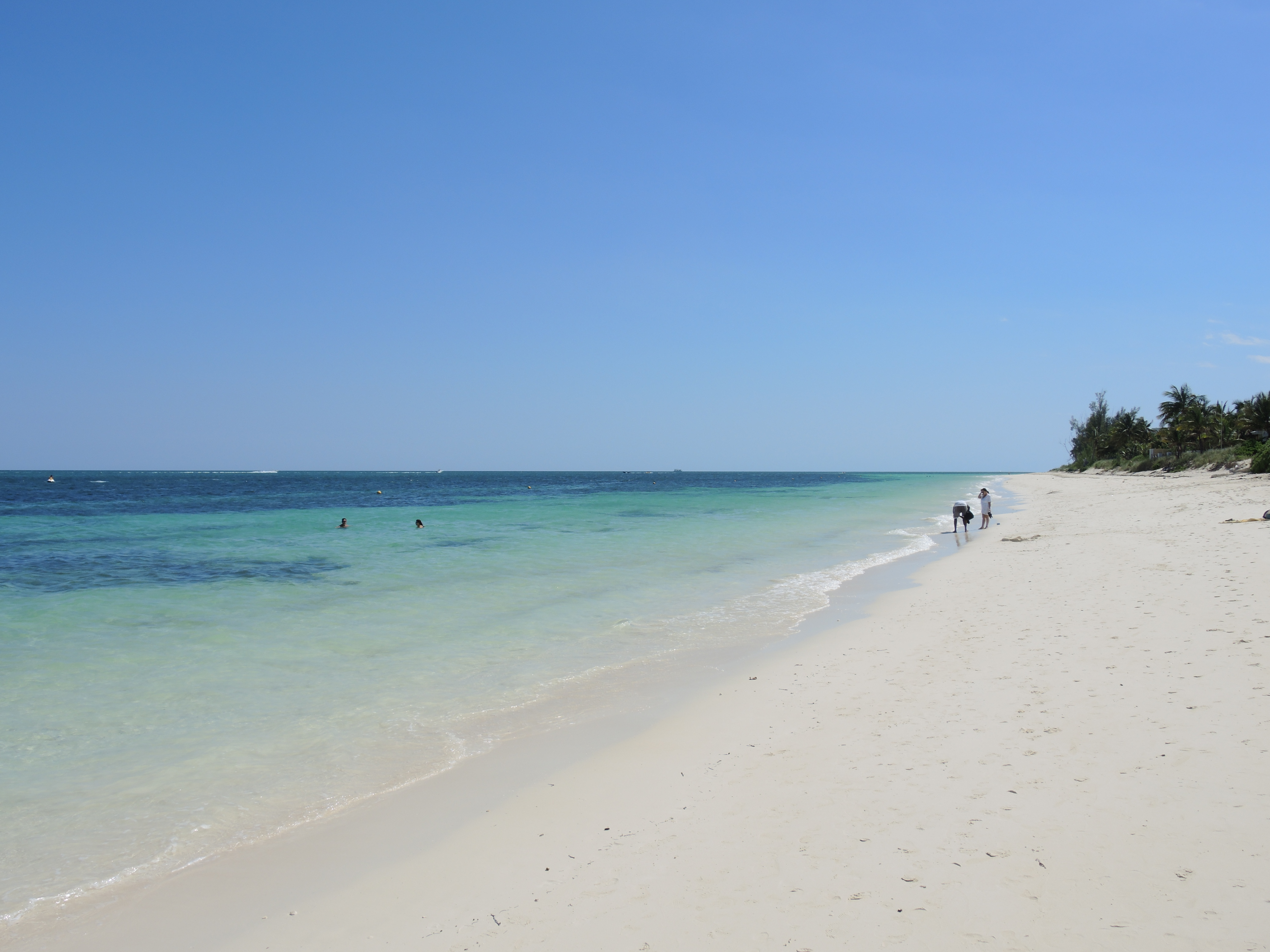
Lucaya beach

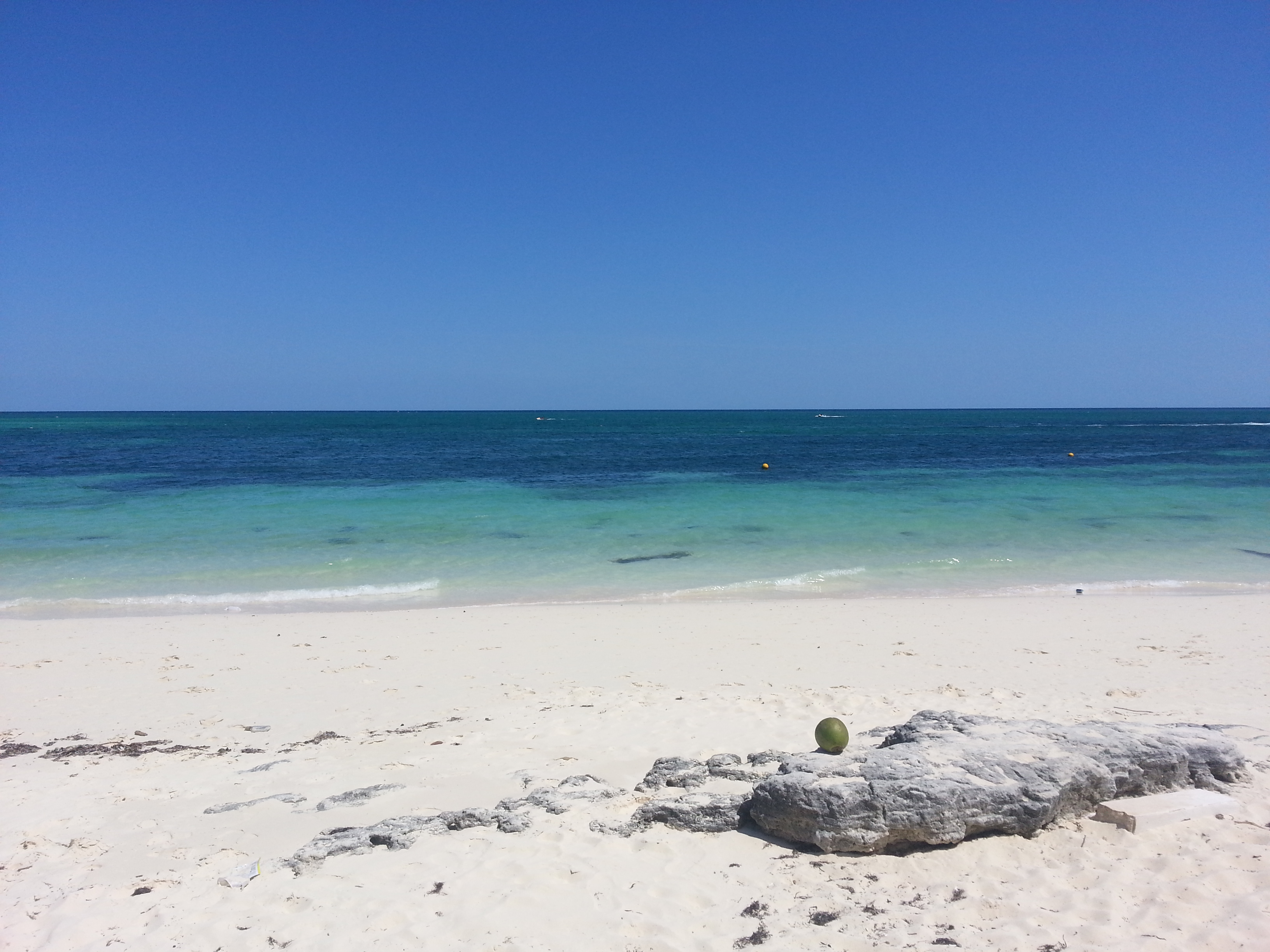
Lucaya seashore

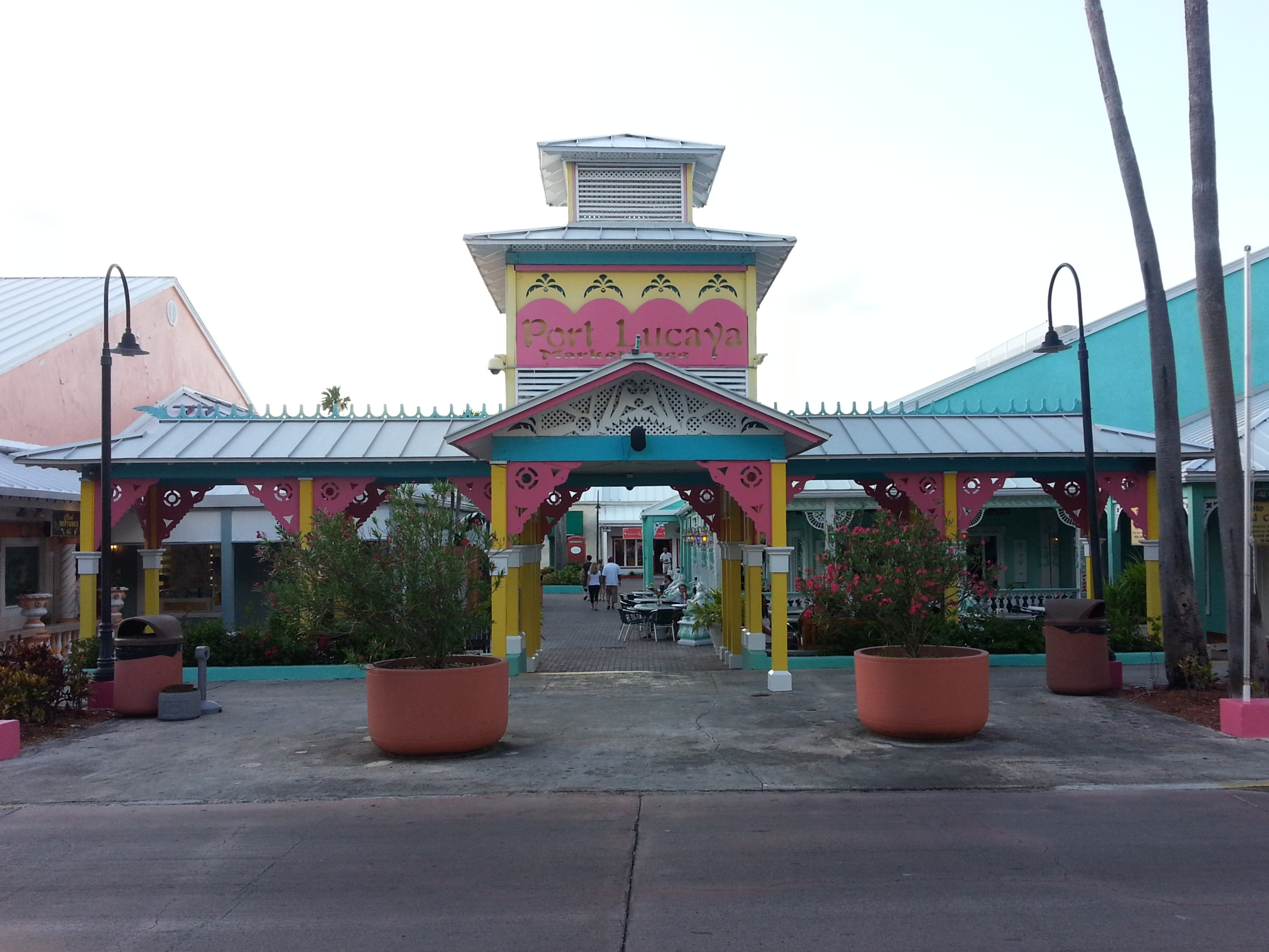
Port Lucaya Marketplace

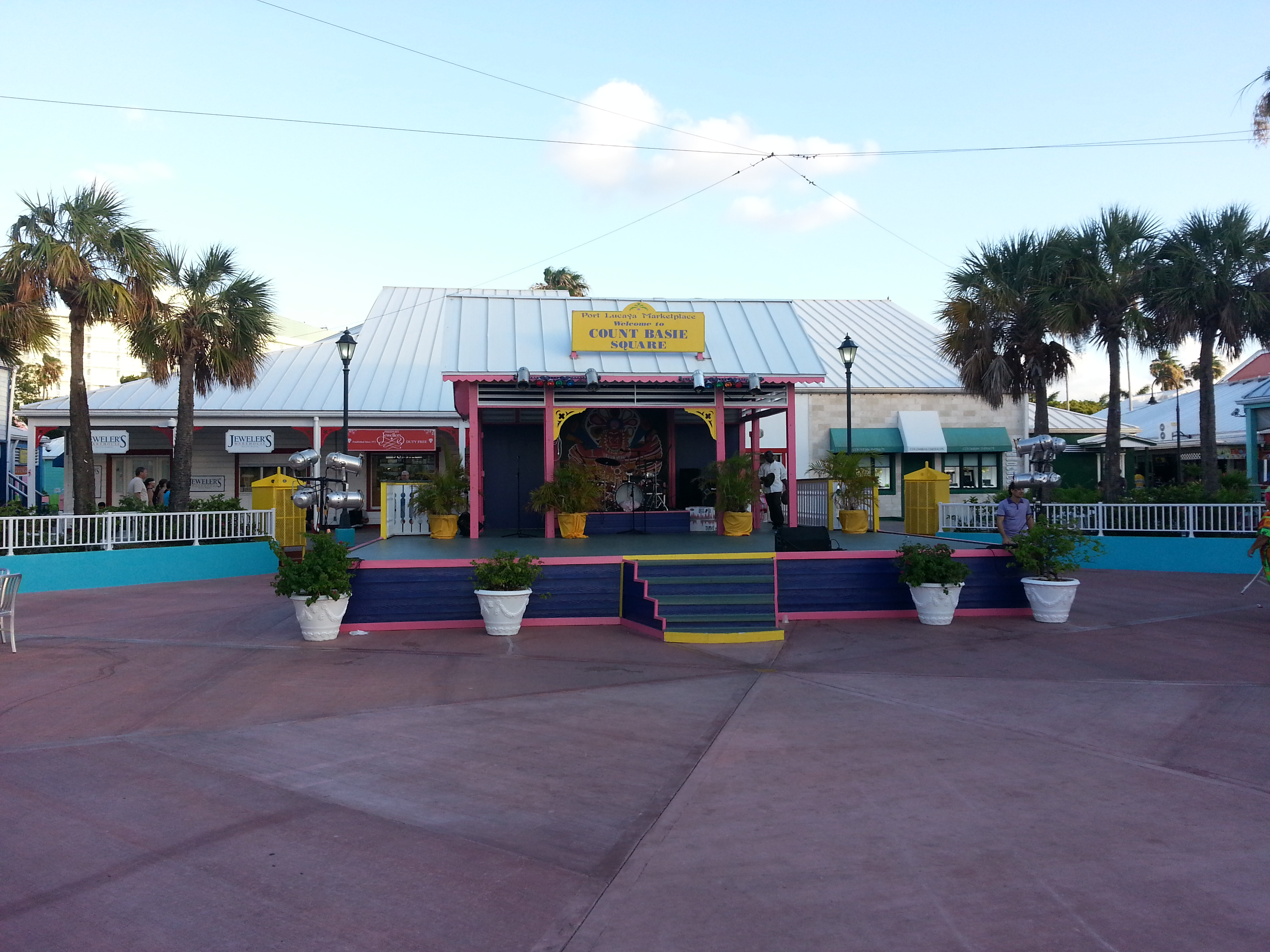
Count Basie Square

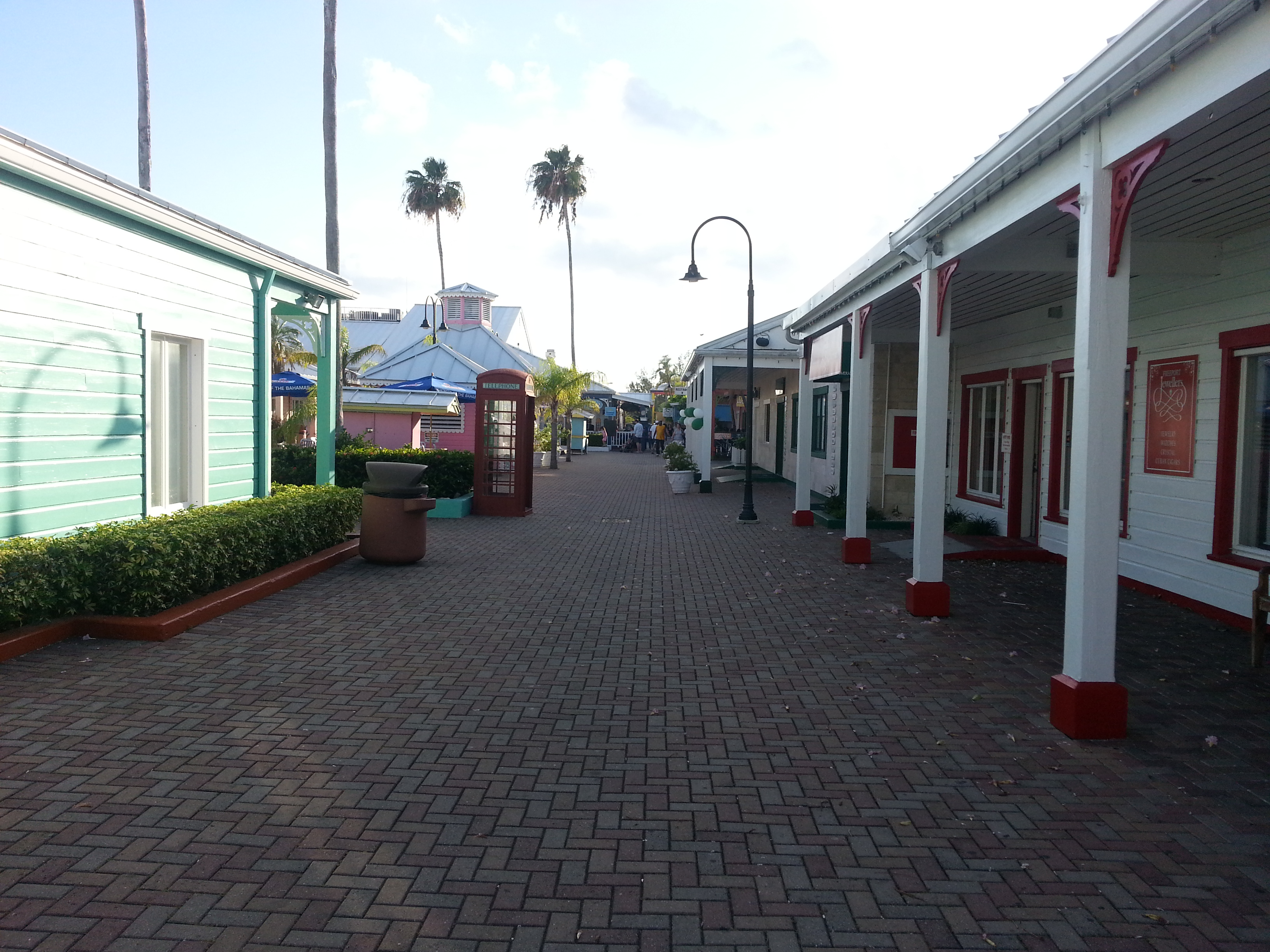
Shops

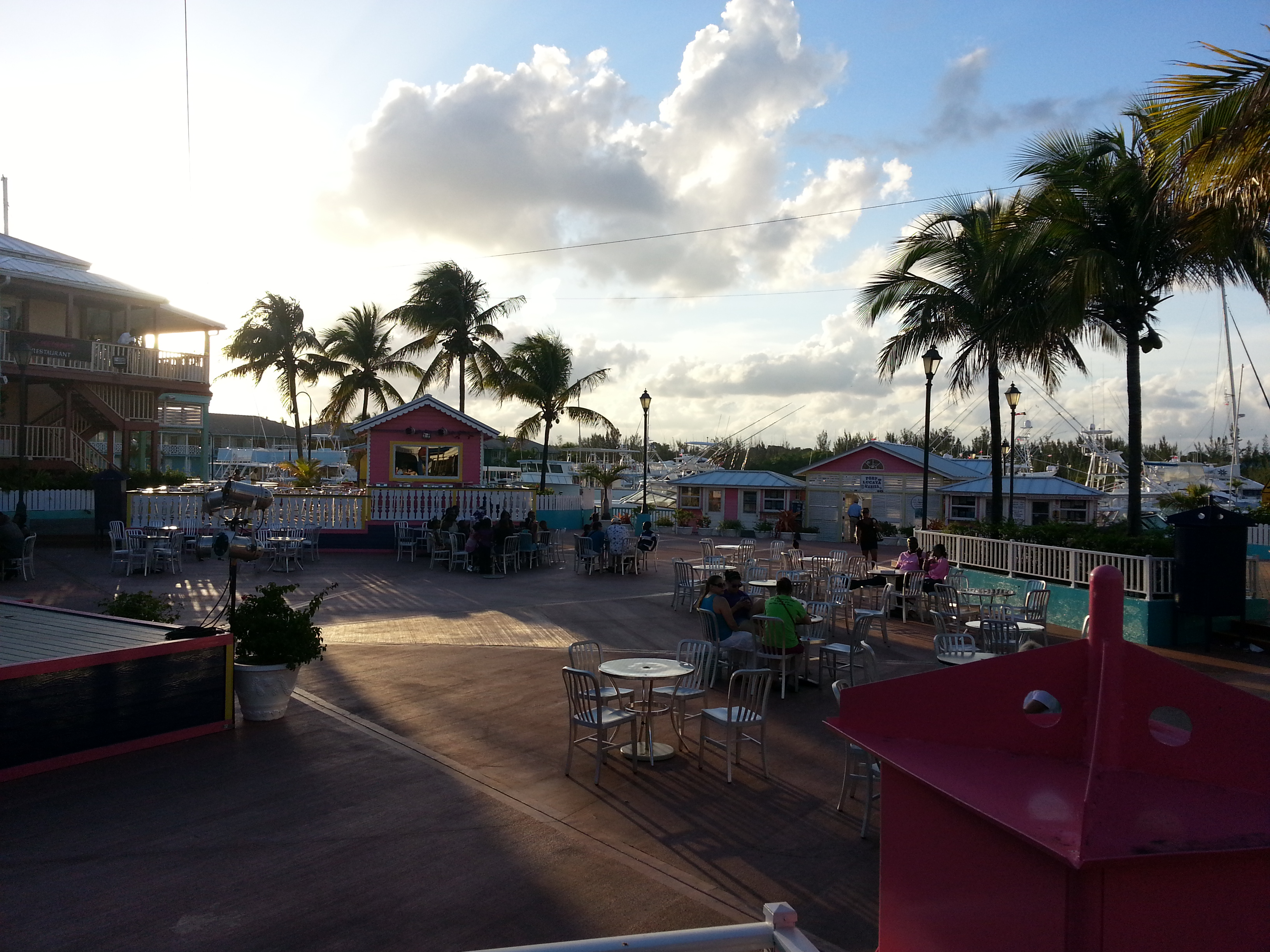
Marketplace and Marina

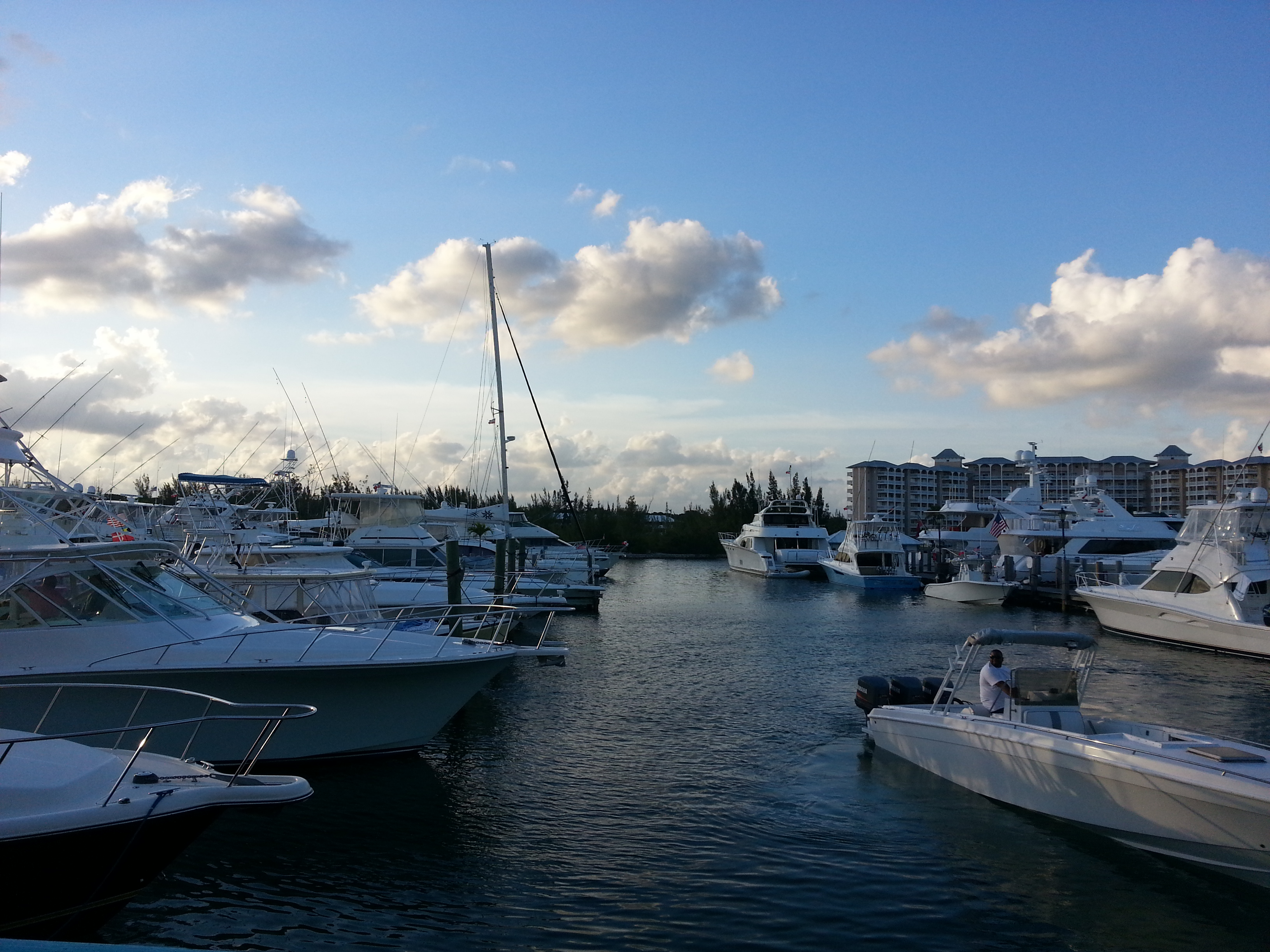
Port Lucaya Marina

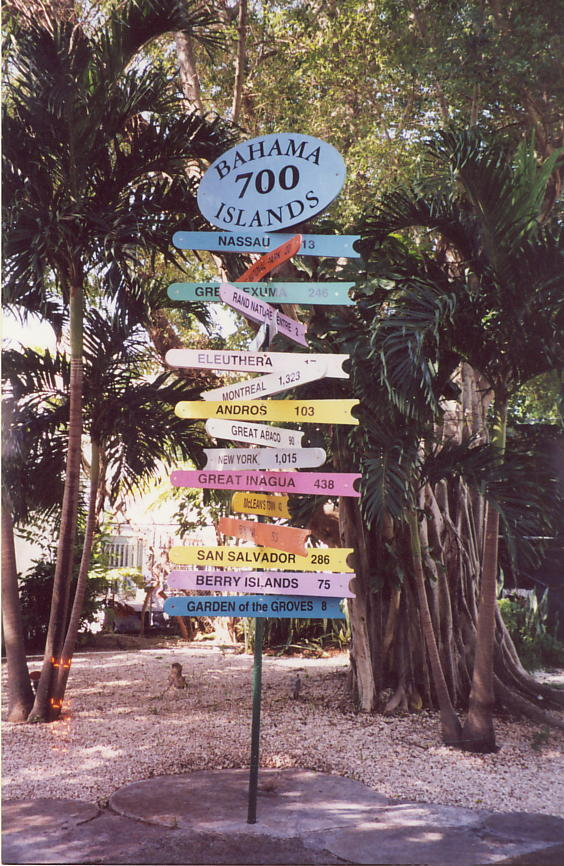
Sign at Lucaya giving distances to other places
