= The Night in Lisbon =

1962 novel by Erich Maria Remarque

- First English-language edition (US)
- Author: Erich Maria Remarque
- Original title: Die Nacht von Lissabon
- Translator: Ralph Manheim
- Language: German
- Genre: War novel
- Publisher: Harcourt, Brace & World (US); Hutchinson (UK)
- Publication date: 1962
- Publication place: Germany
- English publication date: 1964
- Media type: Print (Hardback)
- Pages: 244
- OCLC: 295965

The Night in Lisbon (German: Die Nacht von Lissabon) is a novel by Erich Maria Remarque published in 1962. It revolves around the plight of two German refugees in the opening months of World War II. One of the refugees relates their story during the course of a single night in Lisbon in 1942. The story he recounts is mainly a romantic one, and also contains a lot of action with arrests, escapes and near-misses. The novel is realistic, Remarque was himself a German refugee (although the novel is fictional and only loosely based on the experience of Remarque's friend, novelist Hans Habe), and provides insight into refugee life in Europe during the early days of the war. The book completed what was known as Remarque's "emigre trilogy" along with Flotsam and Arch of Triumph. It was Remarque's last completed work.

== Plot summary ==
The story takes place in the opening months of World War II. Josef Schwarz is a refugee who offers his visa and tickets for America to another refugee desperate to leave Lisbon. He does this in exchange for keeping him company throughout one night, a night in which he relates the story of his and his wife's frantic flight from Nazi Germany to Lisbon.

== Reception ==
The Night in Lisbon became an immediate bestseller in America and Britain when published in English in 1964, remaining on the New York Times Top Ten list for five months. In his review for the Times, Maxwell Geismar called it a "most brooding and thoughtful novel… it may not quite be a great novel, but it is surely one of the most absorbing and eloquent narratives of our period." In a 1964 book review, Kirkus Reviews called the book "limp with romantic despair and frayed cynicism making the experience of dislocation and the concentration camps more acceptable to an audience which has avoided it before... Remarque's old following will find that it has a certain urgency without perhaps pausing to wonder whether it is as real as it is readable." Charles Poore wrote in his review for The New York Times; "It is a brilliant novel and a strange one, not completely successful but hauntingly moving."

== Adaptations ==
=== Television film ===
Director Zbyněk Brynych filmed the book in 1970/1971 for FRG, with the actors Martin Benrath, Erika Pluhar, Vadim Glowna, Horst Frank, Charles Régnier and others. FRG first showed the film on April 9, 1971. It was released on DVD in 2011, in a double DVD edition with a booklet in the "Big Stories" series.

=== Film ===
With an original expected release for the end of 2023, a film based on The Night in Lisbon is being produced. Ian Stokell is the author of the screenplay and producer of the film.

=== Radio ===
In 2019, Radio Bremen and WDR produced a two-part radio play edited and directed by Silke Hildebrandt with Max Simonischek, Max von Pufendorf, Christian Hockenbrink, Lisa Hrdina, Daniel Wiemer, Stefanie Kirsten, Wolfgang Rüter, Ursula Grossenbacher, Jasmin Schwiers, Jörg Kernbach, Justus Maier, Birte Schrein, Jean-Paul Baek, Daniel Stock, and Holger Kraft.
