= Hermann Stieve =

German anatomist (1886-1952)

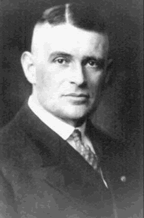
- Born: 22 May 1886; Munich, German Empire
- Died: 5 September 1952 (aged 66); East Berlin, East Germany
- Education: LMU Munich, University of Innsbruck
- Known for: Research on the effects of stress on menstrual cycle; use of corpses of political prisoners executed by Nazi Germany in this research with full awareness of their origin.
- Scientific career
- Fields: Human anatomy, histology
- Workplaces: Humboldt University of Berlin, Center for Anatomy of the Charité
- Doctoral students: Erich Hintzsche

Hermann Philipp Rudolf Stieve (22 May 1886 – 5 September 1952) was a German physician, anatomist and histologist. Following his medical studies, he served in the German Army during World War I and became interested in the effect of stress and other environmental factors on the female reproductive system, the subject of his later research. In 1921, he became the youngest doctor to chair the medical department of a German university. He taught medicine at the Humboldt University of Berlin, and was Director of the Berlin Institute of Anatomy at the Charité teaching hospital in the later years of his life.

Much of Stieve's research was conducted during the 1930s, after the Nazi Party had come to power in Germany. He did not join the party himself, but as an ardent German nationalist supported Adolf Hitler in the hope of restoring national pride. The Nazis imprisoned and executed many of their political opponents, and their corpses became Stieve's primary research material, with his full awareness of their origin.

While much of his work is still considered valuable—among other things, he provided scientific evidence that the rhythm method was not effective in preventing pregnancy—it is considered tainted by his effective collaboration with the Nazi regime's political repression, especially in light of its later genocides.

== Early life ==
Born to a Protestant family in Munich in 1886, he was the son of historian Felix Stieve. His elder brother was future diplomat Friedrich Stieve and his younger sister was future social worker Hedwig Stieve.

Hermann Stieve graduated from that city's Wilhelmsgymnasium in 1905. After a medical internship at Rechts der Isar Hospital, medical studies at the Ludwig-Maximilians-Universität München (LMU) and the University of Innsbruck in nearby Austria and a year's service in the military, he became a physician in 1912. He worked in anatomical research for a year before the First World War began in 1914.

Stieve returned to the Army, where he both tended to patients at the front and taught at the military medical school in Munich. His service was recognized with several awards. After the war he habilitated, writing a paper on the development of the jackdaw's ovary. He took a chair as a lecturer and researcher in anatomy and anthropology at the University of Leipzig. There he was known for giving his lectures in a black academic robe.

== Academic career and political activity ==
Like many German war veterans, Stieve was dissatisfied with the Weimar Republic and its attempt at a democratic government. He was also a German nationalist. These political beliefs led him into many right-wing political and paramilitary organizations of the time, forerunners of the Nazi Party.

He joined the German National People's Party (DNVP) shortly after taking his position at Leipzig, and later the local Freikorps. He also joined the Orgesch, a paramilitary organization that was ordered disbanded by the Allies in 1921 as a violation of the provisions of Treaty of Versailles that limited German rearmament. Later that year Stieve supported the Kapp Putsch, a failed military coup that briefly forced the republic's civilian government to flee Berlin.

Shortly afterwards, he received his doctorate and was appointed a professor of anatomy at Martin Luther University Halle-Wittenberg. He was also made director of the university's anatomical institute, making Stieve, then 35, the youngest doctor ever to chair a medical department at a German university.

That same year, he joined another paramilitary organization, Der Stahlhelm, which primarily served as the DNVP's armed wing, ostensibly providing security at its meetings. For the next five years his academic responsibilities included chairing the German University Committee for Physical Education. Over that time, the militarist elements of the German body politic with which Stieve was involved became stronger, and more openly antidemocratic.

In 1933, as the Nazi government consolidated its power, he was elected rector of the university council. The university was for a time renamed, either at Stieve's initiative or due to a conflict with the university chapter of the National Socialist German Students' League. Like many German academics, Stieve did not protest when the Nazis dismissed Jews from the faculty. However, despite welcoming Adolf Hitler's rule as a restoration of national pride, he did not join the Nazi party, one of the few German medical school administrators who did not do so. Stieve also was a nationalist in the language theme as he supported an intention of replacing English-source words like April and Mai with Germanic equivalents. He did become a member of a party organization passively, when the remaining Stahlhelm were merged into the SA reserve in 1934.

== Medical research ==
Building on his doctoral dissertation, Stieve had continued with his research on ovaries and the female reproductive system. He was particularly interested in how stress affected fertility. In one experiment he put a caged fox near hens to see if they would lay eggs; in another he induced similar stress in female newts.

Ultimately he wanted to study human organs. He was able to get some donated uteruses and ovaries from the bodies of accident victims, or from surgeons who had removed them. One of the best historical sources of organs for research, the bodies of executed criminals, had not been available during the early years of his research as the Weimar government made very minimal use of the death penalty, and did not execute any women. In a 1931 letter Stieve complained that it was difficult to get a set of ovaries from a healthy woman.

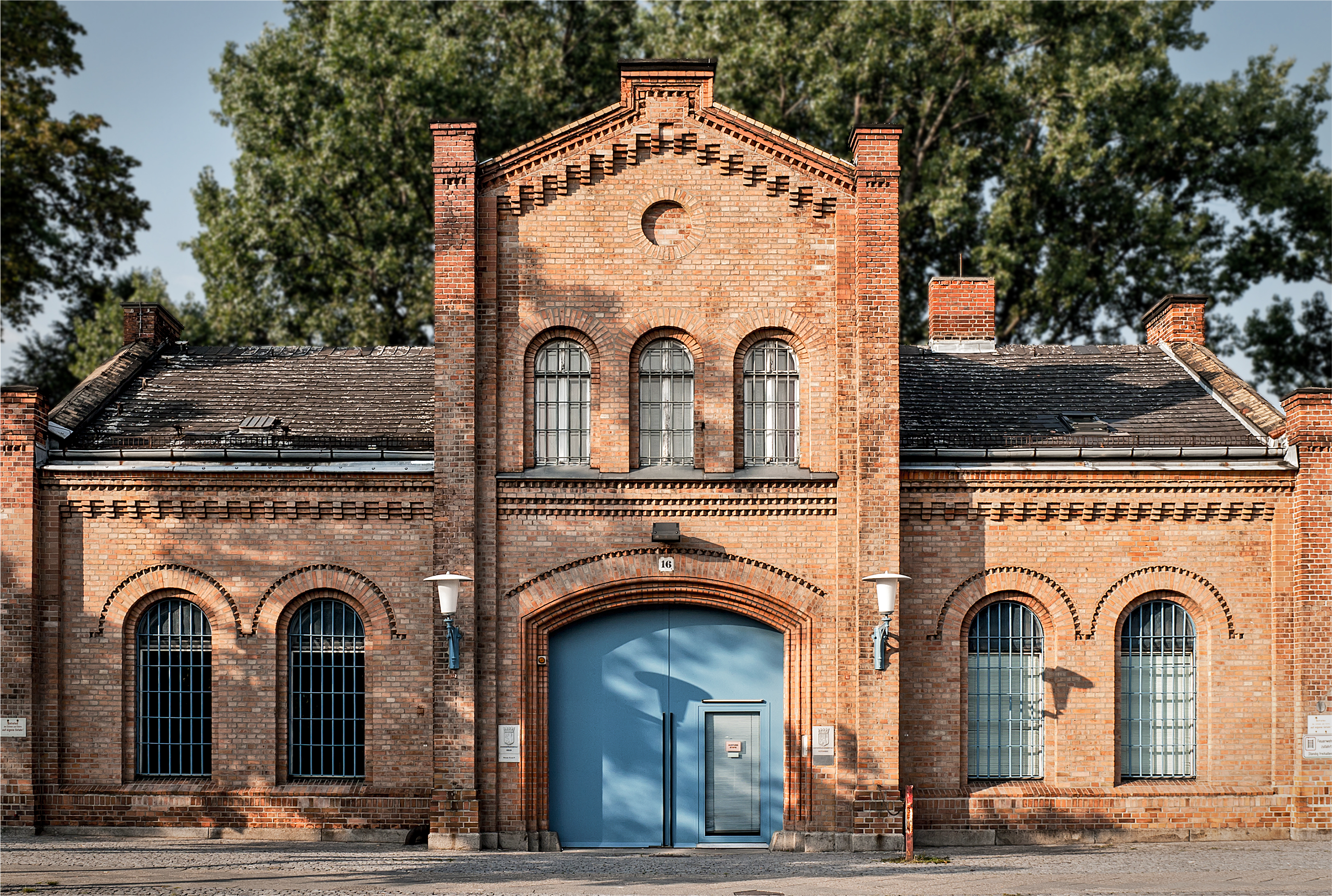
Plötzensee Prison, where Stieve obtained bodies daily

By 1934, the Nazis were arresting many real and perceived opponents. All were imprisoned; enough were executed that there was no longer a shortage of bodies for researchers to use. "The execution chambers of jails throughout the Third Reich were virtual slaughterhouses, and the remains were delivered to every university institute of anatomy in Germany (and probably Austria)," writes University of Toronto medical historian William Seidelman.

Stieve, who had accepted a professorship at what is now Humboldt University of Berlin as well as the directorship of its anatomical institute, reached an agreement with administrators at Plötzensee Prison outside the city to accept all bodies of those shot, hanged or beheaded, many of them political prisoners. Others were "Polish and Russian slave laborers executed for such acts as socializing with German women," according to Seidelman.

Nazi courts ordered dozens and then hundreds of civilian executions each year, for an estimated total of 12,000 to 16,000 from 1933 to 1945. (Note: The 6 million who were killed in concentration camps are counted separately, as are the many millions more who were otherwise mass-murdered.) It is alleged that, during Stieve's "research", he claimed the corpses of 182 victims of the Nazi regime, 174 of whom were women at the age rank from 18 to 68, two thirds of victims were of German origin. Approximately 12,000 to 16,000 civilians were executed during the Nazi regime from 1933 to 1945 in Germany.

For the female corpses he was particularly interested in, Stieve made use of the prison's detailed recordkeeping. He got histories that included information about how the women had reacted to their death sentences, how well they had adjusted to prison life, and the timing of their menstrual cycles. When a woman of reproductive age was to be executed by the Gestapo, Stieve was informed, a date of execution was decided upon, and the prisoner told the scheduled date of her death. Stieve then studied the effects of the psychic trauma on the doomed woman's menstrual pattern. Upon the woman's execution, her pelvic organs were removed for histological (tissue) examination. Stieve published reports based on these studies without hesitation or apology. He wrote 230 papers on the effect of stress on the female reproductive system. Women facing execution ovulated less predictably, he found, and sometimes experienced what he called "shock bleedings". One paper argued that the Knaus–Ogino rhythm method of contraception was ineffective due to the variations of the cycle. Despite Stieve's errors in understanding the physiology, his conclusion is still accepted as correct.

Since he took care of all the prison's bodies, he had some influence with officials there. In 1942 they changed schedules so that executions took place at night; Stieve was able to persuade them to return to mornings so that he could process the bodies and tissue the same day. Claims that his influence went so far as to choosing the women's execution dates based on their cycles have been debunked, and other reports that he allowed SS officers to rape some prisoners in order to study sperm migration have not been substantiated and appear dubious (none of Stieve's papers mention sperm as a subject of inquiry); although Seidelman, who first reported this, insists it occurred. Nor, contrary to another report, did Stieve make soap from the remains of the bodies after they had been dissected.

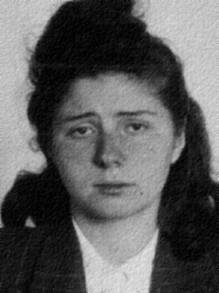
Liane Berkowitz

Among those who went to his lab tables following their death were some of the more notable members of the limited German resistance of the Nazi era. The bodies of Harro Schulze-Boysen and his wife Libertas, along with Arvid Harnack and Liane Berkowitz, all members of the Red Orchestra, which tried to thwart Germany's invasion of the Soviet Union in 1941, were taken there after their executions near the end of 1942. The next year the body of Elfriede Scholz, sister of novelist Erich Maria Remarque, was also released to Stieve after her execution for "undermining morale" after saying that the war was lost. Stieve's list of his research files was obtained 70 years later and as of 2018 these documents are held in Memorial Site for the German Resistance in Berlin.

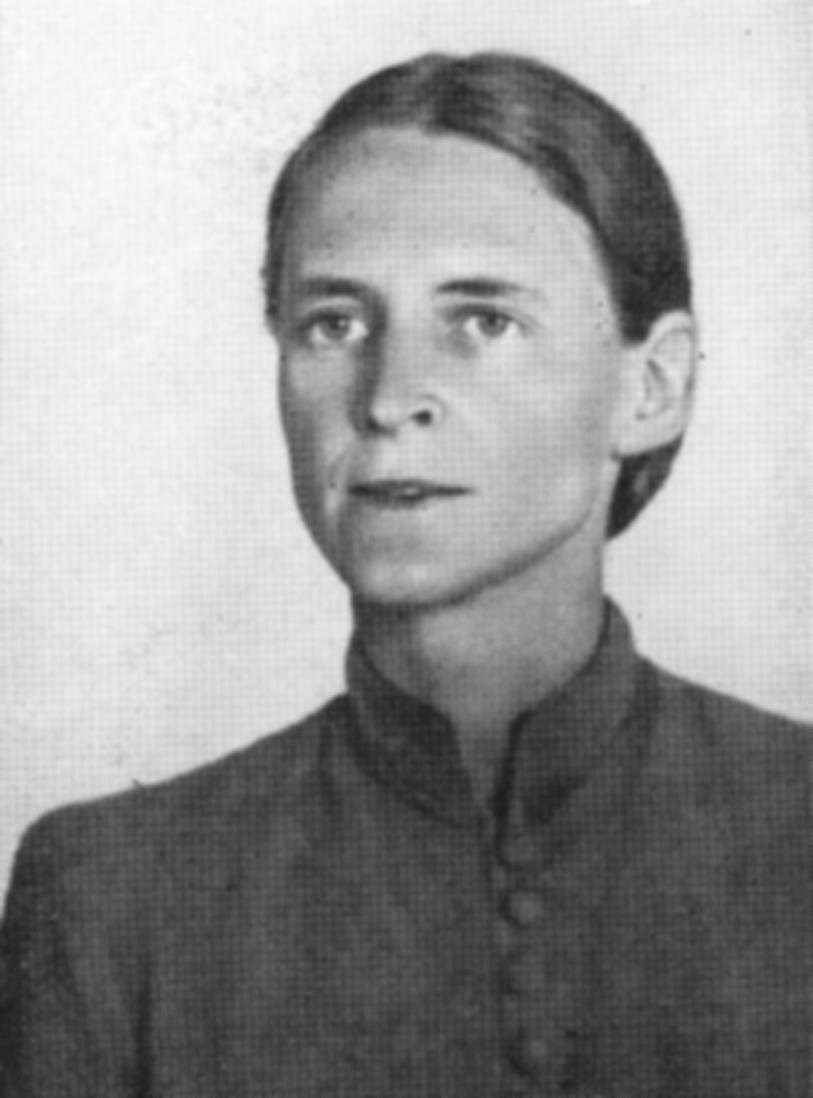
Mildred Fish Harnack, executed for espionage in 1943. Her body is the only one of the 182 Stieve used for research whose burial location is known

Harnack's Wisconsin-born wife, Mildred, originally seemed to escape this fate when she received a six-year sentence for her espionage activities. It was overturned on Hitler's direct order, to be replaced with beheading, making her the only American woman Hitler personally ordered executed. Another one of Stieve's students carried her remains home in a shopping bag and had them buried in Zehlendorf Cemetery, making her the only member of the Red Orchestra whose burial site is known.

When the bodies of Harnack and the Schulze-Boysens were in the examining room, one of Libertas' friends, Charlotte Pommer, who had gone into medical studies, recognized them and quit the program on the spot, since she knew that Libertas wanted to be buried somewhere quiet and tranquil. Later Pommer became a dissident herself, hiding a family member of one those involved in the 1944 assassination attempt on Hitler and eventually being jailed herself near the end of the war. She is the only one of Stieve's students or assistants known to have left the program for moral reasons. Stieve himself claimed to have refused the bodies of some of the assassination plotters but reportedly had no problem dissecting the body of Walter Arndt, a longtime friend who was executed in 1944. He reputedly kept Arndt's heart.

== After the war ==
When the war ended, both the occupying powers and the families of the dead began trying to learn what had happened to the bodies of those executed. In many cases it was impossible, as documentation was unavailable and what bodies and samples remained were rarely identifiable. The identities of those Stieve did his research on only became known almost 70 years after the war when a list he had compiled in 1946 for a Protestant minister trying to help some of the relatives of Plötzensee inmates find their remains. They were published in a medical journal by another researcher, Sabine Hildebrandt.

Like many German doctors who had been in some way complicit with the Nazi regime's crimes against humanity, Stieve was never held accountable. After the Doctors' Trial at Nuremberg in 1946 led to convictions of 14 physicians who had conducted experiments on unwilling living subjects in concentration camps, the country's medical profession looked within itself to see who else among its members had also committed war crimes. In 1948 it was announced that only several hundred of the country's thousands of physicians had done so, a number that excluded Stieve and many of his fellow anatomists who did their work at universities rather than camps. The profession was worried about the possible loss of teaching physicians to Germany if all who had accepted bodies of the executed for research were imprisoned or otherwise disqualified from practicing or teaching.

He did defend his work on one occasion. "[An anatomist] only tries to retrieve results from those incidents that belong to the saddest experiences known in the history of mankind," he said. "In no way do I need to be ashamed of the fact that I was able to reveal new data from the bodies of the executed, facts that were unknown before and are now recognized by the whole world." He denied, however, that the executed victims he had done his research on were political prisoners. After his death the Bavarian Academy of Sciences and Humanities acknowledged the criticism of Stieve's work in the obituary it published in its yearbook. It felt compelled to put to rest "spiteful false accusations" by pointing out that Stieve had never set foot in a concentration camp, nor had he made any request to the prison administration that "this or that should happen" before the execution. The bodies he dissected, it claimed, were either victims of accidents or common criminals lawfully sentenced to death. He continued to manage his university's Institute of Anatomy and only his death broke his work in 1952. Despite their being involved in different war crimes half of Germany's doctors who were the members of the Nazi Party continued practicing after the war.

For his work, he was elected to the German Academy of Sciences at Berlin and the German Academy of Sciences Leopoldina. The Royal Swedish Academy of Sciences also extended membership to him. The hospital erected a bust of Stieve and named a lecture hall after him. He died from a stroke in 1952 while serving as the institute's director. He had wanted to leave his own body to science, but after his wife objected he was buried.

== Legacy ==
Stieve's work continues to be both scientifically important and controversial, as its full circumstances become known. On his centennial in 1986, he was praised as "a great anatomist who revolutionised the basis of gynaecology through his clinical-anatomical research." In a 2009 review, German medical historians Andreas Winkelmann and Udo Schagen conclude that "Stieve was neither a murderer nor a fervent Nazi. Nevertheless, his research results were flawed by their ethical and political context."

Stieve's research, although not in a form directly attributed to him, was the basis of a controversy over rape and pregnancy during the 2012 U.S. Senate elections. In Missouri, Rep. Todd Akin, the Republican candidate, justified his opposition to allowing women impregnated during rapes to have abortions, asserted that in cases of "legitimate rape" the stress would make conception unlikely. The basis for the claim was a 1972 book by antiabortion activist Fred Mecklenburg, which cited a purported Nazi experiment in which women put under traumatic stress did not ovulate. Sabine Hildebrandt, a historian and anatomist at Harvard Medical School recognized this as apparently an imperfect understanding of Stieve's findings.

== See also ==
- August Hirt
- Eduard Pernkopf, Austrian anatomist whose eponymous atlas is also likely based on the bodies of executed Nazi prisoners.
