= Nahne =

District of Osnabrück, Lower Saxony, Germany

Coordinates: 52.2472°N 8.0583°E

Nahne is a district in the south of Osnabrück, Germany with a population of 2,241 residents (as of 31 October 2009), thus making it the city's smallest district in terms of population. It covers an area of 4.854 km^{2}.

== Geography ==
To the north Nahne borders on the district of Schölerberg, on Kalkhügel to the north-west, Sutthausen to the west and Voxtrup to the east. Georgsmarienhütte’s Harderberg district shares a border with Nahne to the south.

The district's terrain is hilly – it is positioned between the Schölerberg and the Osterberg (127 m and 173 m above sea level respectively. Most of its land area is used for agricultural purposes. The district is divided along a north–south axis by the Iburger Straße (Bundesstraße 51 and Bundesstraße 68) and an east–west axis by Bundesautobahn 30. The main residential areas are located to the north-west and the south-east of this transport axis.

== History ==
Nahne's history as a farming community goes back roughly 850 years; it used to belong to the parish of St. Johann (St. John) in Osnabrück. Prior to its incorporation into the city on 1 July 1972 it had strong economic links to Osnabrück – due to its largely agrarian character which had helped provide the city with agricultural produce. Until 1934 Nahne had occupied a considerably larger area, stretching all the way up to the district of Fledder in the north. Today the district is characterised by estate houses and large supermarkets; the Osnabrück district's administrative centre (Kreishaus) is located to its east, and a number of medium-sized workshops and other businesses in the west, spread out towards the district's border on Sutthauser Straße. As an independent community Nahne did not have its own crest.

== Personalities ==
From August to November 1920 the author Erich Maria Remarque worked as a primary school teacher in Nahne.

Nahne is the birthplace of Christian Kleiminger, an SPD politician and representative for Rostock in the Bundestag. He attended the local Franz-Hecker-Grundschule (primary school) from 1972 to 1976.

== Places of interest and events ==
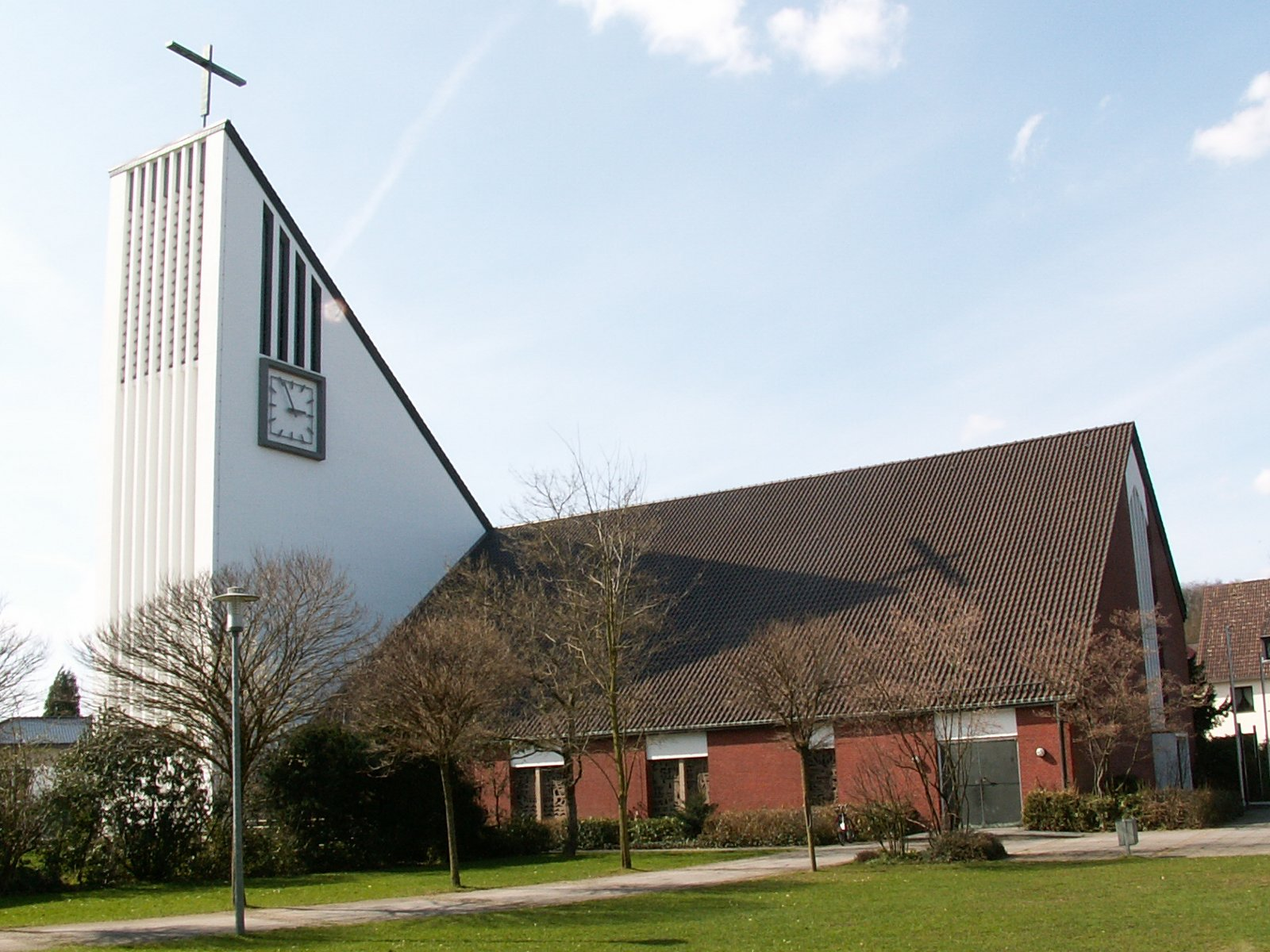
St. Ansgar Kirche (St. Ansgar's Church)

- St. Ansgar's Kirche (St. Ansgar Church)
- Zoo Osnabruck
- Museum am Schölerberg (natural history museum)
- Planetarium (in the Museum am Schölerberg)
- Grasstrack racing: since the mid-1950s an international motorcycle racing competition has taken place on the grasstrack in Nahne. The event attracts interest from outside the region. It is hosted by the Auto- und Motorsportgemeinschaft Osnabrück (Osnabrück Car and Motor Sports Association).

== District assembly ==
The Kreishaus of the Osnabrück district is located in Nahne, within the boundaries of the city. The district assembly – the area's highest authority – meets there. Various other administrative bodies of the district are also based in the Kreishaus.
