= Casa Monte Tabor =

Villa in Ticino, Switzerland

Coordinates: 46.1464344°N 8.7325869°E

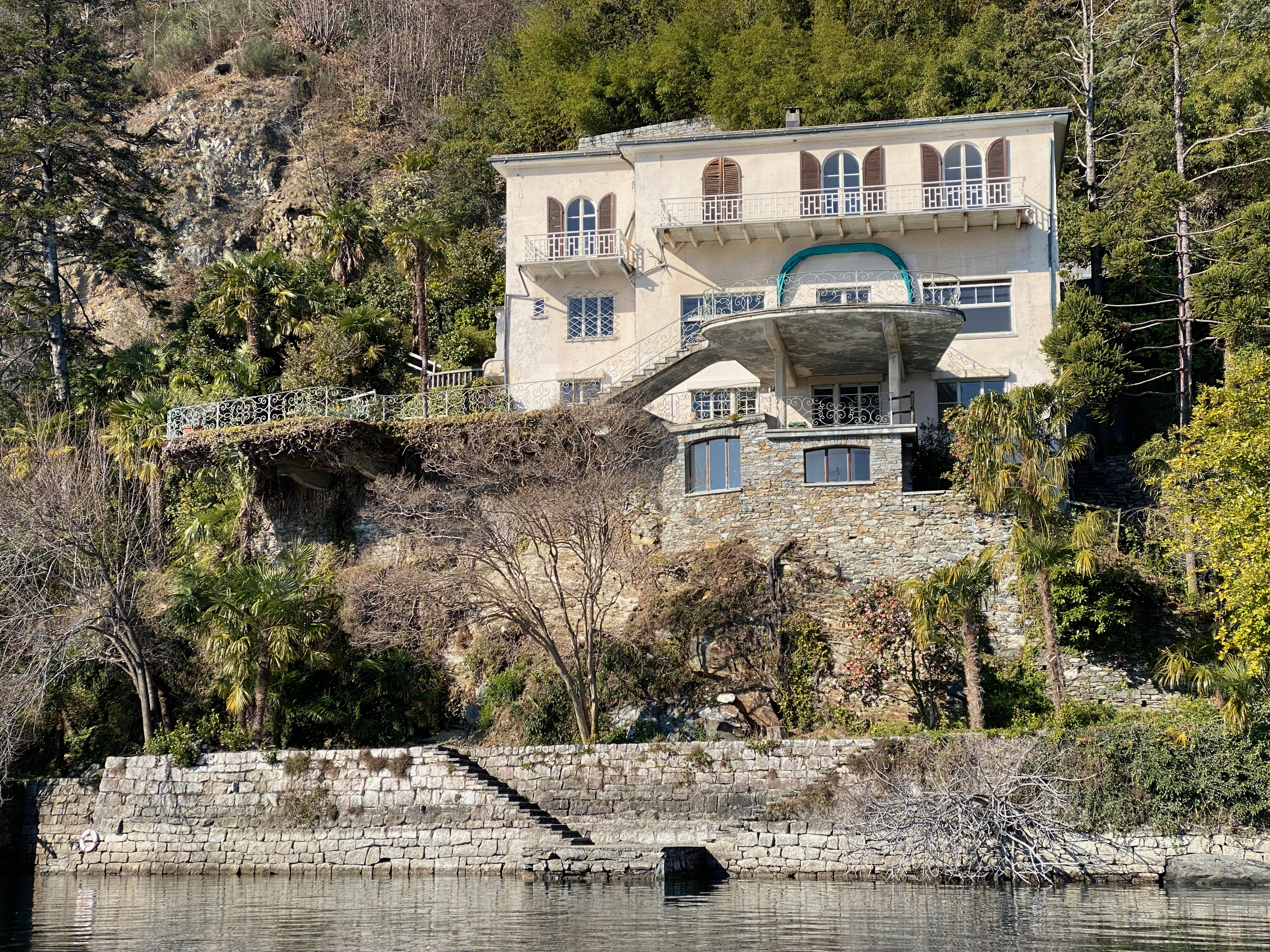
Casa Monte Tabor in 2022

Casa Monte Tabor is a cultural-historic significant building in Porto Ronco, a district of Ronco sopra Ascona, in the Swiss canton of Ticino. In 1931, writer Erich Maria Remarque (1898–1970) bought the villa and lived there until his death. His wife Paulette Goddard (1910–1990) inherited the property from him. After her death the canton of Ticino, because of taxes (inheritance), confiscated the property, which was owned by different people after that.

Casa Monte Tabor is also known as Villa Tabor, Villa Remarque or Villa Remarque Goddard.

== Location ==
Casa Monte Tabor stands on a hillside on a lake property at the northern bank of the eastern part of Lake Maggiore in Switzerland, about 10 m (33 ft) apart from the water. Directly beyond the property the cantonal road between Ascona and Brissago passes by. The street is only overlooked by the third floor. Along the shore, Ascona (to the north) and Brissago (to the south) are each about 3 km (1.9 mi) away.

The name Casa Monte Tabor is derived from its location below Monte Tabor, which was named after the biblical Mount Tabor in Galilee (Israel). A narrow stream bed called the Riale del Monte Tabor flows into the lake from Monte Tabor at the southern border of the property.

== Architecture ==
Striking features are the high base and the cubic, angular character of the three-story villa, the terraces on two floors with an elaborate connecting structure and the harmonious integration into the terraced garden with old trees and bushes.

The building has largely been preserved in its original condition. The only major structural change was the reconstruction of the upper terrace, which had access from the large salon on the middle floor and a connecting staircase to the large terrace on the lower floor. In its place, around 1960, Remarque had a much larger, round, platform-like terrace built with a floating staircase connecting to the lower terrace. Since the terrace was financed by the compensation that Remarque received from the Federal Republic of Germany for his expatriation and the confiscation of his assets during World War II, it is also called the Restitution Terrace.

== History ==
=== Construction ===
It is unclear when Casa Monte Tabor was built and by whom. Numerous articles state that the villa was built or lived in by the famous Swiss painter Arnold Böcklin (1827–1901). However, this cannot be proven.

This is probably a case of confusion with the Swiss painter Eduard Rüdisühli (1875–1938), who was relatively certainly the previous owner of the villa before Erich Maria Remarque. Eduard Rüdisühli used the villa as a summer residence from 1905 to 1915. Around 1910 he painted the picture Castello Monte Tabor, which shows the Casa Monte Tabor. Eduard Rüdisühli was probably the previous owner from 1905 to 1931, because Remarque bought the villa from a painter named Rüdisühli. This shows that Casa Monte Tabor was built before 1905.

It was probably built in at least two phases, as shown by the fundamental renovation work since 2023. Originally it was significantly smaller and consisted only of a low basement built directly on the rock and one floor above with three rooms of the same size next to each other facing the lake. Possibly around 1920 – this is where the earliest entry in the land register can be found – the Casa was expanded both in width and height. The width extension in a southerly direction contained the later kitchen room in the basement and a separate entrance room on the first floor. The original three rooms on the first floor were connected to form a large salon. Probably at the same time, the casa was expanded in height with an additional upper floor.

The construction work for the expansion may have been carried out by the Swiss architect Oswald Roelly, who later led the work on the Hotel Monte Verità designed by Emil Fahrenkamp in the Bauhaus style. Oswald Roelly, along with other architects from German-speaking Switzerland or Germany such as Emil Fahrenkamp, Carl Weidemeyer, Fritz Bähler, Max Schmuklerski and Otto Zollinger, were among the protagonists of modern architecture in Ascona, which was already influenced by the Bauhaus style (1919–1933). Influences of the Bauhaus style can be seen at Casa Monte Tabor in the flat roof and the balconies on the upper floor with typical Bauhaus railings as well as in the interior design.

=== Erich Maria Remarque ===
In August 1931, Remarque bought the villa on the recommendation of his girlfriend Ruth Albu, allegedly because she was already afraid that Remarque would have to flee Germany soon. The next year he reportedly negotiated with the architect Hermann Zweigenthal about a possible renovation. It is not known exactly what was planned; no renovation took place.

On January 29, 1933, on the eve of the seizure of power of the National Socialists, Remarque fled Berlin to his Swiss domicile. The villa became an important refuge for those persecuted in Nazi Germany. Their escape was organized and financed from Porto Ronco.

In April 1933, the Jewish journalist Felix Manuel Mendelssohn died violently at night near the villa. It was reasonable to assume that he had previously stayed in the villa, which Remarque denied in the Neue Zürcher Zeitung. It was suspected that it was a Nazi assassination attempt, which was possibly aimed at Remarque.

Remarque lived in the villa until he emigrated to the USA in 1939. After nine years of exile in the United States, he returned here in 1948. After his marriage to American Hollywood actress Paulette Goddard in 1958, she lived with him in the villa. According to Remarque, he wrote almost all of his books in the villa except for the first, most famous work, All Quiet on the Western Front. He lived here until his death in 1970.

Numerous important personalities were guests at the villa, including the writers Hans Habe, Else Lasker-Schüler, Carl Zuckmayer, Robert Neumann, Herbert Read, Arthur Koestler, Heinz Liepman, Emil Ludwig, Thomas Mann, Theodor Plievier, Curt Riess, José Orabuena (born Hans Josef Sochaczewer), Fritz von Unruh, Ludwig Renn, Ernst Toller, Joseph Roth and Franz Werfel, the publishers Kurt Desch, Reinhold Neven DuMont and Joseph Caspar Witsch, the sculptor Remo Rossi, the writer and photographer Annemarie Schwarzenbach, the director Georg Wilhelm Pabst, the pop-art artist Andy Warhol, a close friend of Paulette Goddard, and the entrepreneur Max Emden, owner of the neighboring Brissago Islands. Walter Feilchenfeldt, art dealer and close friend of Remarque, as well as his wife, the photographer Marianne Breslauer, were also frequent guests at Villa Tabor. Between 1939 and 1948, Walter Feilchenfeldt also managed the villa on behalf of Remarque, who was living in exile in America.

In September 1965, the garage and the southern third of the garden were badly damaged by a rock avalanche.

=== After Remarque's death ===
After Erich Maria Remarque's death in 1970, his wife Paulette Goddard lived in the villa until her death in 1990. The villa was bequeathed to New York University as part of the estate of Paulette Goddard. Since New York University was not prepared to pay the associated inheritance tax of 18 million Swiss francs to the Canton of Ticino, the villa was confiscated by the canton.

The canton sold the villa at an auction on October 4, 1994 to Christoph Dornier, a son of the German aircraft engineer Claude Dornier. Christoph Dornier planned to demolish the villa and build a new, probably more profitable building. However, since the villa was protected at the time and could not be demolished, he sold the villa to an American-English couple in 1999.

When the villa was offered for sale again around 2010, there was initially no buyer, probably due to the high price and the high costs of modernizing the villa. In order to save the villa from demolition, an initiative was organized to save the villa and acquired the right to purchase it for one year with the municipality of Ronco sopra Ascona on February 28, 2011 for 200,000 Swiss francs. The initiative, with the participation of the Remarque Society in Osnabrück, planned to acquire the villa with public money and sponsorship support and to build a literary and cultural centre there.

However, since the purchase price of 6 million Swiss francs could not be raised, the right to purchase expired. However, the American-English couple wanted the villa to be preserved and not sold to real estate investors, who would probably have demolished the villa in favour of a more profitable new building.

In 2021, the property was purchased by a German couple who wish to preserve Casa Monte Tabor as a place to promote peace and preserve the legacy of Erich Maria Remarque. It will continue to be used for events on peace topics. The villa has been extensively renovated in 2023.

== Media ==
- Erich Maria Remarque. Dokumentation von Victor J. Tognola und Anne-Marie Tognola, Schweiz 2011 (53 Minuten).
