= Arch of Triumph (novel) =

1945 novel by Erich Maria Remarque

- First US edition
- Author: Erich Maria Remarque
- Original title: Arc de Triomphe
- Translator: Walter Sorell and Denver Lindley
- Language: German
- Genre: War novel
- Publisher: Appleton-Century (US)
- Publication date: 1945
- Publication place: United States
- Media type: Print (hardcover & paperback)
- Pages: 455 pp
- OCLC: 296103

Arch of Triumph (French: Arc de Triomphe) is a 1945 novel by Erich Maria Remarque about stateless refugees in Paris before World War II. Written during his exile in the United States (1939–1948), it was his second worldwide bestseller, after All Quiet on the Western Front.

== Plot ==
The novel is set in Paris, in 1939. Despite having no permission to perform surgery, stateless refugee Ravic, a very accomplished German surgeon, has been "ghost-operating" on patients for two years on the behalf of two less-skillful French physicians.

Unwilling to return to Nazi Germany, which has stripped him of his citizenship, and unable to exist legally anywhere else in pre-war western Europe, Ravic manages to hang on. He is one of many displaced persons, without passports or any other documents, who live under a constant threat of being captured and deported from one country to the next, and back again.

Ravic has given up on the possibility of love, but life has a curious way of taking a turn for the romantic, even during the worst of times.

== Main characters ==
- Ravic (real name Ludwig Fresenburg) – a refugee surgeon from Germany who has no citizenship.
- Joan Madou – actress, singer. Her father is Romanian, her mother is Italian.
- Haake – a German Gestapo man who tortured Ravic and committed his beloved girl Sibylla to suicide.
- Veber – a gynecologist from the Durand Clinic, Comrade Ravic.
- Durant – the famous doctor, the owner of the clinic. A good diagnostician but a poor surgeon, he hires other doctors who operate on patients instead of him.
- Kate Hegstrom – an American, Ravic's first patient, sick with inoperable cancer.
- Boris Morosow – a tall and strong 60-year-old bearded man, an émigré from Russia; there is a porter at the Scheherazade establishment. Dreams of revenge against the communists who tortured his father.
- Aaron Goldberg – Ravich's neighbor at the 'Internationale' Hotel.
- Ruth Goldberg – the wife of Aaron Goldberg.
- Ernst Zeylenbaum – Doctor of Philology and Philosophy, an illegal migrant, lived for six years at the 'Internationale'.
- Rosenfeld – an emigrant who sells unique paintings (Van Gogh, Cézanne, Gauguin, Sisley, Renoir, Delacroix) to survive.
- Jeannot – a 13-year-old boy who had his leg amputated after an accident.
- Lucienne – unsuccessfully performed an abortion with a non-professional midwife, and then went to the clinic, where she was operated on by Ravic.
- Rolande – a brothel manager, acquaintance of Ravic since he comes to give examinations to the prostitutes in his capacity as doctor.

== Adaptations ==
In 1948, the novel was made into a feature film starring Ingrid Bergman and Charles Boyer.

In 1984, it was adapted into a television film starring Anthony Hopkins and Lesley-Anne Down.

In 2000, Takarazuka Revues Snow troupe staged a musical adaptation of the novel, starring Yu Todoroki as Ravic and Hitomi Tsukikage as Joan. It was performed again in 2018, also by Snow troupe, and also starring Yu Todoroki as Ravic. Kiho Maaya played the part of Joan, and Futo Nozomi played the part of Boris.

== Relationship to other works ==
Remarque's earlier novel, Flotsam, is also about the lives of stateless individuals. The character Ravic makes brief appearances in three of Remarque's other novels: Shadows in Paradise, The Promised Land and Game.
