= Arch of Triumph (1948 film) =

1948 American film

- Film poster
- Directed by: Lewis Milestone
- Screenplay by: Lewis Milestone; Harry Brown; Irwin Shaw (uncredited)
- Based on: Arch of Triumph by Erich Maria Remarque
- Produced by: David Lewis
- Starring: Ingrid Bergman; Charles Boyer; Charles Laughton; Ruth Warrick; Roman Bohnen; Ruth Nelson; Michael Romanoff
- Cinematography: Russell Metty
- Edited by: Duncan Mansfield
- Music by: Louis Gruenberg
- Production company: Enterprise
- Distributed by: United Artists (United States & Canada); Metro-Goldwyn-Mayer (International; through Loew's Inc.)
- Release dates: February 17, 1948 (Miami, Beach, Florida); March 6, 1948 (United States)
- Running time: 120 minutes 133 minutes (restored version)
- Country: United States
- Languages: English; German
- Budget: USD $4,250,000or $5,000,000
- Box office: $4,100,000 (total)

Arch of Triumph is a 1948 American romantic war drama film directed by Lewis Milestone and starring Ingrid Bergman, Charles Boyer, and Charles Laughton. It is based on the 1945 novel Arch of Triumph by Erich Maria Remarque, which he wrote during his nine-year exile in the United States.

== Plot ==
Pre-World War II Paris is crowded with illegal refugees, trying to evade deportation. One of them is Dr. Ravic, who practices medicine illegally under a false name, helping other refugees. He saves Joan Madou from committing suicide after the sudden death of her lover. They become involved, but he is deported and she becomes the mistress of Alex, a very wealthy man. Ravic eventually returns, still seeking revenge against the Nazi officer, von Haake, who tortured Ravic's beloved to death. Von Haake is in Paris, in civilian dress, for some unknown, sinister purpose.

On September 1, 1939, Germany invades Poland. Two days later, Britain and France declare war on Germany. Ravic kills von Haake, but so quickly that the villain does not know why he is dying. Meanwhile, Joan's jealous lover shoots her, then comes to Ravic for help. The bullet has injured her spine, leaving her paralyzed except for her left arm. Ravic operates on her in a vain attempt to save her. Dying, she begs him to end her suffering. He comforts her and they speak of their love while she dies. He goes home to find that the authorities are checking papers at the hotel. He waits in line with his friend, Boris, who predicts a stay in a concentration camp. Ravic believes that they will be useful, now that war is here. Boris bids him an affectionate farewell, promising to meet at Fouquet's after the war. The last shot of the film is through the Arc de Triomphe.

== Cast ==
- Ingrid Bergman as Joan Madou
- Charles Boyer as Dr. Ravic
- Charles Laughton as von Haake
- Louis Calhern as Boris Morosov
- Ruth Warrick as Kate Bergstroem [scenes deleted]
- Roman Bohnen as Dr. Veber
- J. Edward Bromberg as Hotel manager at the Verdun
- Ruth Nelson as Madame Fessier
- Stephen Bekassy as Alex
- Curt Bois as Tattooed waiter
- Art Smith as Inspector
- Michael Romanoff as Capt. Alidze

== Background ==
The film's name is a reference to the Arc de Triomphe in Paris, where the film is set.

Producer David Lewis said he read the novel and "was overwhelmed by it and knew that it was one of those stories that seldom come to a producer and one in which I felt I had to participate." Lewis bought the rights from the author and set up the film at Enterprise along with another story from Remarque, The Other Love.

Irwin Shaw spent five months writing a screenplay which minimized the love story. Lewis recalled the draft was "deeply disappointing. He had rewritten the novel into a new Shaw version and there was little left of the meaning of Remarque's work. Shaw hated rewriting and resisted all of our suggestions. Eventually, by contract, he made some changes, but they were minor — he was one stubborn character."

Lewis offered the male lead to Laurence Olivier who was enthusiastic provided Simone Signoret was cast opposite him. Lewis was agreeable to this but the producer claims Charles Einfeld, head of production at Enterprise Studios, wanted a bigger female star. Ingrid Bergman wound up being cast although Lewis said "I thought her a ravishing beauty with a tremendous gift of health, but I was not impressed with her acting talents and thought them highly overrated." According to Lewis it was Bergman who insisted on Lewis Milestone as the director and Charles Boyer as her co star. Ingrid Bergman's salary was $175,000 + 25% of net profits. William Conrad, in his fourth film, has a small, important (uncredited) role as a policeman. Lewis Milestone brought in Harry Brown to rewrite the script.

== Production ==
Filming took 29 weeks all up including four weeks where the unit was shut down.

Michael Chekov, cast as the Nazi commander, had a heart attack and was replaced by Charles Laughton. Lewis wrote "Chekov had played the part with a quiet menace better suited to the part than Laughton's overplaying. Charles was a brilliant actor, but not controllable."

The rough cut of the film was four hours long, and several subplots and at least one actor were cut in reducing it to two hours. The head of the MPAA's Production Code Administration at the time, Joseph Breen, made the studio tone down the violence in the script. Breen also objected to the fact that the murder went unpunished, but he relented on the basis that it was a war story.

Lewis claimed the film cost $1,800,000 but the paper cost was $4,400,000 because it had to absorb all the studio's overhead. Variety gave the budget as $4,250,000.

== Reception ==
=== Box office ===
In July 1948 Variety estimated the film would make $2.5 million in North America and $1.6 million abroad. By January 1949 Variety revised the film's North American rentals as at $1.7 million

== 1984 film for television ==
In 1984, Charles E. Israel adapted the novel for British television, with Anthony Hopkins as Dr. Ravic, Donald Pleasence as von Haake, Lesley-Anne Down as Joan Madou and Frank Finlay as Boris Morosov. Waris Hussein directed. This made-for-television film was released in the United States in 1985.

== See also ==
- Production Code

== Notes ==
- Lewis, David (1993). Curtis, James (ed.). The Creative Producer. Metuchen: Scarecrow Press. ISBN 0-8108-2720-4.
