= So Ends Our Night =

1941 film by John Cromwell

- Directed by: John Cromwell
- Screenplay by: Talbot Jennings
- Based on: Flotsam; 1941 novel by Erich Maria Remarque
- Produced by: David L. Loew; Albert Lewin
- Starring: Fredric March; Margaret Sullavan; Frances Dee
- Cinematography: William H. Daniels
- Edited by: William Reynolds
- Music by: Louis Gruenberg
- Production company: David L. Loew-Albert Lewin Productions
- Distributed by: United Artists
- Release date: February 27, 1941
- Running time: 117 minutes
- Country: United States
- Language: English
- Budget: $900,000

So Ends Our Night is a 1941 American drama film directed by John Cromwell and starring Fredric March, Margaret Sullavan and Frances Dee. The screenplay was adapted by Talbot Jennings from the novel Flotsam by German exile Erich Maria Remarque, who rose to international fame for his first novel, All Quiet on the Western Front.

== Plot ==
In 1937 Austria, Josef Steiner, a middle-aged German veteran who escaped from a concentration camp two years ago, and Ludwig Kern, a 19-year-old German from a prosperous family with Jewish blood, are picked up by the police. Lacking passports, they face deportation. Brenner, a German agent whom Steiner knows, offers him a passport in exchange for the names of the friends who helped him escape the camp, but Steiner demurs.

Steiner and Kern share a jail cell with other prisoners, including the Chicken, the Pole and a professional gambler/pickpocket who is proud of his "full rights of citizenship." Steiner studies the gambler's card tricks and also befriends the miserable Kern. Deported together, they part at the border, Kern to search for his parents in Prague, Steiner to live by his wits in Austria.

They struggle to find normality in a Europe that is heading for a cataclysmic war. Steiner pines for the wife whom he had left behind and whom his politics have endangered. In Prague, Ludwig meets lovely Jewish exile Ruth Holland, but she is hesitant to enter into a new relationship. In a flashback, her German fiancé insults and abandons her when her Jewish identity threatens his career. Ludwig follows Ruth to Vienna and visits Steiner, now working as a carnival barker, who helps Ludwig secure a job with the carnival. Ruth is unable to continue her studies because she has no passport and seeks out Ludwig, who is thrilled to see her again. Ludwig is beaten by a suspicious carnival customer and then again by the police. He is incarcerated with the same prisoners as in the previous jail stay, and they teach him how to fight.

Lilo, a beautiful carnie with a crush on Steiner, tells Ludwig that Ruth has been deported to Zürich, so Ludwig heads there upon his release and finds Ruth staying in the home of a wealthy school friend. Ruth begs to accompany him to Paris, the location of his next plan for survival.

Steiner watches in horror as the Nazis annex Austria during the Anschluss. No longer safe in Vienna, he is chased by dogs at the border before plunging into a river to escape. Ruth and Ludwig traverse the Alps to reach the French border. After a Swiss Nazi spy has Ludwig arrested, the local gendarme allows him to escape and a friendly doctor visits ailing Ruth in their hideout and orders her to the hospital. Ludwig is once again thrown into jail when he stands outside her hospital window, but he is freed, Ruth recovers and they continue to France.

In Paris, they encounter Ruth's former professor, also an exile, who informs them that Paris is flooded with Austrian refugees and that without work permits, they will not find jobs. Steiner, the Chicken and the Pole reappear and they all celebrate. Ludwig learns that university professor Durant loves Ruth and would marry her, which would solve her passport problem. Ludwig tries to convince Ruth to marry Durant, but she refuses because she loves Ludwig.

The exiles are able to take jobs at a construction site. Steiner learns that his wife is in the hospital with only a few days to live. Over Ludwig's objections, Steiner uses his fake Austrian passport to return to see her one last time. As soon as Steiner heads to Germany, Ludwig is caught and sent to a prison on the border, from where he will once again be deported. He writes Ruth to marry Durant, but Ruth again refuses and concocts an idea to save Ludwig: by threatening to marry Durant, scandal will befall his family unless his influential uncle helps arrange for Ludwig's release.

After crossing the border, Steiner is instantly detained by a group of Gestapo and interrogated. He promises to divulge names if he is permitted to see his wife. He says goodbye at her deathbed, then grabs the leader of the Gestapo group, Brenner and leaps to his death, rather than informing on his friends.

Steiner has left the young couple all of his money, and now they can each have passports. They mourn Steiner's sacrifice on the train that is taking them to freedom.

== Cast ==
- Fredric March as Josef Steiner
- Margaret Sullavan as Ruth Holland
- Frances Dee as Marie Steiner
- Glenn Ford as Ludwig Kern
- Anna Sten as Lilo
- Erich von Stroheim as Brenner
- Allan Brett as Leo Marrill
- Joseph Cawthorn as Leopold Potzloch
- Leonid Kinskey as The Chicken
- Alexander Granach as The Pole
- Roman Bohnen as Mr. Kern
- Sig Ruman as Ammers
- William Stack as Professor Meyer
- Lionel Royce as Barnekrogg
- Ernst Deutsch as Dr. Behr
- Emory Parnell as Weiss
- Gerta Rozan as Elvira
- Wolfgang Zilzer as Vogt
- Janet Waldo as Jacqueline
- Georgia Backus as Mrs. Kern
- Hans Schumm as Kobel
- Philip Van Zandt as Bachmann
- Edward Fielding as Durant
- Frederik Vogeding as Gestapo Colonel
- Kate MacKenna as Mrs. Ammers
- Edit Angold as Mrs. Ammers' Sister
- Adolph Milar as Black Pig Proprietor
- Gisela Werbisek as The Harpy
- Lisa Golm as The Pale Woman
- Spencer Charters as Swiss Policeman
- Hermine Sterler as Berlin Nurse
- Paul Leyssac as Swiss Judge
- Wilhelm von Brincken as German Official
- Brenda Fowler as Woman in Prague

== Reception ==
Glenn Ford's performance earned high honors and afforded him subsequent film offers and great popularity. To promote the film, Ford embarked on a publicity tour.

The film premiered at New York City's Radio City Music Hall on February 27, 1941 and began screening at Grauman's Chinese Theatre in Hollywood on March 19. President Franklin D. Roosevelt attended a special screening of the film at the White House on January 30 and invited the cast to his annual birthday ball that night.

In a contemporary review for The New York Times, critic Bosley Crowther lauded the film as "told with great poignance and sympathy" but wrote: "It would indeed be gratifying to be able to say that it is told with great dramatic effectiveness, too. But it isn't. For the story ... follows too rigid and monotonous a narrative form: it documents rather than dramatizes the wretched lives of its characters. And although John Cromwell has drawn much pathos and affecting tenderness from individual scenes, his direction of the picture as a whole has been too slow, too solemn and much too tedious. So Ends Our Night continues for the seemingly interminable length of two hours."

Critic Philip K. Scheuer of the Los Angeles Times called So Ends Our Night "the most challenging of recent American releases" and wrote: "[S]ome of the scenes are gems. The memory of these scenes is what one carries away from the theater—poignant fragments of a whole rather than the whole itself... for this the producers have found too big for their medium."

Louis Gruenberg's score earned the film's only Academy Award nomination.
