= Karl Wilhelm Zimmermann =

Karl Wilhelm Zimmermann (born 10 April 1861, Neunkirchen, Saarland; died 1935) was a German anatomist, pathologist and histologist, known for his eponymous contribution in the Zimmermann–Laband syndrome. His name also appears in Zimmermann's arch (an aborted, rudimentary arch of the embryo, supposed to explain the origin of certain vessels between the fourth aortic and the fifth arches) and Zimmermann's elementary particle (an obsolete term for blood platelet).

== Education and career ==
Zimmermann studied in Berlin from 1882 and received his doctorate in 1887. From 1894 to 1927 was an assistant in the anatomical institutes at Greifswald and Berlin, as well as prosector at Giessen and in Bern, Switzerland. He became Dozent of anatomy at Bern in 1894. From 1898 he was professor extraordinary, and in 1927 he was appointed ordinary professor as well as director of the anatomical institute in Bern.

Hans Bluntschli succeeded him in the chair of anatomy and embryology at Bern in 1933. Erich Hintzsche, the Swiss physician and historian came under the anatomical influence of Zimmermann, who was his chief when he moved to Bern in 1928.

== Scientific contributions ==
He was the first person to name the 'pericyte,' the macula densa cells of the renal tubules and also the 'basal body'

Although Alexander Onufrievich Kovalevsky in 1867 and Paul Langerhans in 1876 had described flagellated cells and illustrated them, Zimmermann, using iron-haematoxylin stains, actually termed the central flagellum (Centralgeissel) in 1894, and again later in 1897. He was the first to discover the presence of primary cilia in mammals(including human beings) In 1898, he even speculated that “One could also imagine that this delicate flagellum, whose movement may have no significant impact upon the secretions that are found in the glandular lumen, may work as a kind of sensory organ, that is, changes in the configuration of the secretions flowing inside the glandular lumen might have a stimulating effect upon the flagellum, whereby the secretory function might be qualitatively or quantitatively affected” thereby predicting their function as flow sensors a century before the experimental demonstration of it by Praetorius and Spring.
