= Arch of Triumph (1984 film) =

- DVD cover
- Genre: Drama; Romance; War
- Based on: Arch of Triumph by Erich Maria Remarque
- Written by: Charles E. Israel
- Directed by: Waris Hussein
- Starring: Anthony Hopkins; Lesley-Anne Down; Donald Pleasence
- Music by: Georges Delerue
- Country of origin: United Kingdom
- Original language: English

Production
- Executive producer: Patrick Dromgoole
- Producers: Mort Abrahamson; Peter Graham Scott; John Newland
- Production location: Paris
- Cinematography: Bob Edwards
- Running time: 94 minutes
- Production companies: Callendar Company; HTV; Newland/Raynor Productions Inc.

Original release
- Network: ITV
- Release: 19 December 1984
- Network: CBS
- Release: 29 May 1985

Arch of Triumph is a 1984 British television film by HTV. It is based on the novel Arch of Triumph by Erich Maria Remarque. The novel was previously adapted in 1948 for a film of the same name with Ingrid Bergman and Charles Boyer. It was released on 19 December 1984 in the UK, and on 29 May 1985 in the US.

It was directed by Waris Hussein and produced by Mort Abrahamson, Peter Graham Scott and John Newland. The adaptation was by Charles E. Israel, the music score by Georges Delerue and the cinematography by Bob Edwards.

The film stars Anthony Hopkins, as Ravic, an Austrian doctor, Lesley-Anne Down as Joan Madou, and Donald Pleasence as Haake a Gestapo chief with Frank Finlay, Joyce Blair and Richard Pasco.

In the film, Joan Madou (Lesley-Anne Down) sings "J'attendrai".

== Plot ==
Ravic is an Austrian doctor who helped Jews escape from the Nazi regime. He was tortured in a concentration camp. In 1939 he is living in Paris, under a false name and without any documents, constantly aware of the risk of being arrested. At night, on one of Paris' bridges over the Seine, Ravic meets Joan Madou, a woman about to (possibly) attempt suicide, and helps her. This is the start of a romance. But the prickly Ravic has unfinished business with the Nazis, and in particular Haake the Gestapo chief who had sent him to the concentration camp after spotting him in the street. He is separated from Joan after being discovered as refugee without papers. With no communication possible between them, they each try to manage under difficult circumstances and, when they finally meet up again after six months of unexplained absence, there are shadows hanging over their relationship. They cautiously try to mend their broken affair as international events spin out of control around them.

In the end, as planned, Joan tells her lover that she is leaving him for Ravik and meets Ravik at a restaurant. But he has sighted Haake at another table and is so consumed by revenge that he sends Joan away, even though she tells him that her lover threatens to kill her if she leaves him. The radio and newspapers warn that war is imminent. Ravic kills Haake, but so abruptly that he does not have time to reveal his identity or call Haake to account for the lives he destroyed. Joan's lover does shoot her, and hours later he goes to Ravic for help.

When Ravic operates he discovers the bullet cannot be removed. Paralyzed, dying and in pain, Joan makes him promise to release her.. They declare their love and when a wave of agony overcomes Joan, he gives her an injection that eases her pain and then frees her. "My life, my love... God, Why?" he sobs in despair.

His friend Boris offers him false identity papers, but Ravic is tired of running and living without a name. He turns himself in to the French authorities and is sent to an internment camp. He tells a pregnant woman on the truck not to worry. A fellow passenger says "Here we go again". "Ah yes," Ravic replies, "Human beings can stand a great deal." The truck drives off through the night, towards the Arc de Triomphe. The audience knows that the war is about to start and that the Nazis will march into Paris along the same route.

== Production ==
The filming took place on various locations including Paris and Bath.

== Reception ==
Filmdienst described it as being globally successful and with accurate characterisations and impressive acting from the lead role. The New York Times said that the director "manages to retain an unusual degree of ominous tension throughout the movie" and as "an adult story told with a minimum of audience-research distractions".
