= Spark of Life =

Spark of Life may refer to:

- "Spark of Life" (CSI), a fifth-season episode of the American crime drama CSI: Crime Scene Investigation
- Spark of Life (novel), a 1952 novel by Erich Maria Remarque
- "That Spark of Life", a 1943 novel by Pavel Bazhov
- Spark of Life (album), a 2014 album by Marcin Wasilewski
- Vitalism, the belief in a "vital spark" of life
