= Shadows in Paradise =

Shadows in Paradise may refer to:

- Shadows in Paradise (1986 film), a Finnish art house comedy-drama film
- Shadows in Paradise (2010 film), an American action film
- Shadows in Paradise (novel), a 1971 novel by Erich Maria Remarque
