= Elfriede Scholz =

Sister of Erich Maria Remarque, victim of Nazism (1903–1943)

- Born: March 25, 1903; Osnabrück
- Died: December 16, 1943 (aged 40); Plötzensee Prison, Berlin
- Occupation: Dressmaker
- Known for: being sister of Erich Maria Remarque, falling victim to the political repression of the Nazi regime.

Elfriede Maria Scholz, née Remark (March 25, 1903 – December 16, 1943) was the younger sister of writer Erich Maria Remarque. She was executed by the Nazi regime for anti-Nazi remarks.

== Biography ==
Elfriede Remark, younger sister of writer Erich Maria Remarque, was born on 25 March 1903 in Osnabrück. She was fifth younger child in the family of Remark. She was educated as a dressmaker. Elfriede worked as a dressmaker, first in Leipzig, then in Berlin, and later in Dresden. She was married for short time to Erich Scholz (Heinz Scholz) in 1941, then divorced.

After two women reported to the Nazi regime that they overheard Elfriede as she was scolding the Nazi Party and Adolf Hitler, she was arrested in Dresden on August 18, 1943, and imprisoned in the prison in Moabit, Berlin. She was indicted by the People's Court (Volksgerichtshof) on October 26, 1943, on charges of Wehrkraftzersetzung (undermining the war effort), specifically by "continuing and publicly undermining the military strength of the German people and aiding and abetting the enemy". Remarque, who had escaped to the United States in 1939, later said that his sister had been involved in anti-Nazi resistance activities.

On October 29, Elfriede was sentenced to death by the court's presiding judge Roland Freisler, who declared, "Ihr Bruder ist uns leider entwischt – Sie aber werden uns nicht entwischen" ("Your brother is unfortunately beyond our reach – you, however, will not escape us.") She was directed for execution to Plötzensee Prison in Berlin, but authorities unexpectedly cancelled the execution, because the execution paper was burnt during an Allied air raid, and after a week in the Plötzensee Prison she was directed to the Barnimstrasse women's prison, then a month later she was directed back to Plötzensee and guillotined on December 16, 1943.

Her body was handed over to Center for Anatomy of the Charité for medical experiments, while authorities told her sister that Elfriede's body was properly buried and demanded that the sister pay the expenses of the execution procedures.

Erich Maria Remarque, who had resided in the United States during the Nazi reign, only learned about the execution of his sister in 1946. He hired a lawyer, Robert Kempner, to find and charge those guilty of his sister's death, but the case was dismissed by the Berlin Court of Appeal in 1970, with Remarque dying shortly afterwards.

== Legacy ==
Erich Maria Remarque dedicated the novel Spark of Life (1952) to his sister.

A Stolperstein for Elfriede Scholz was placed in Dresden (see the photograph).

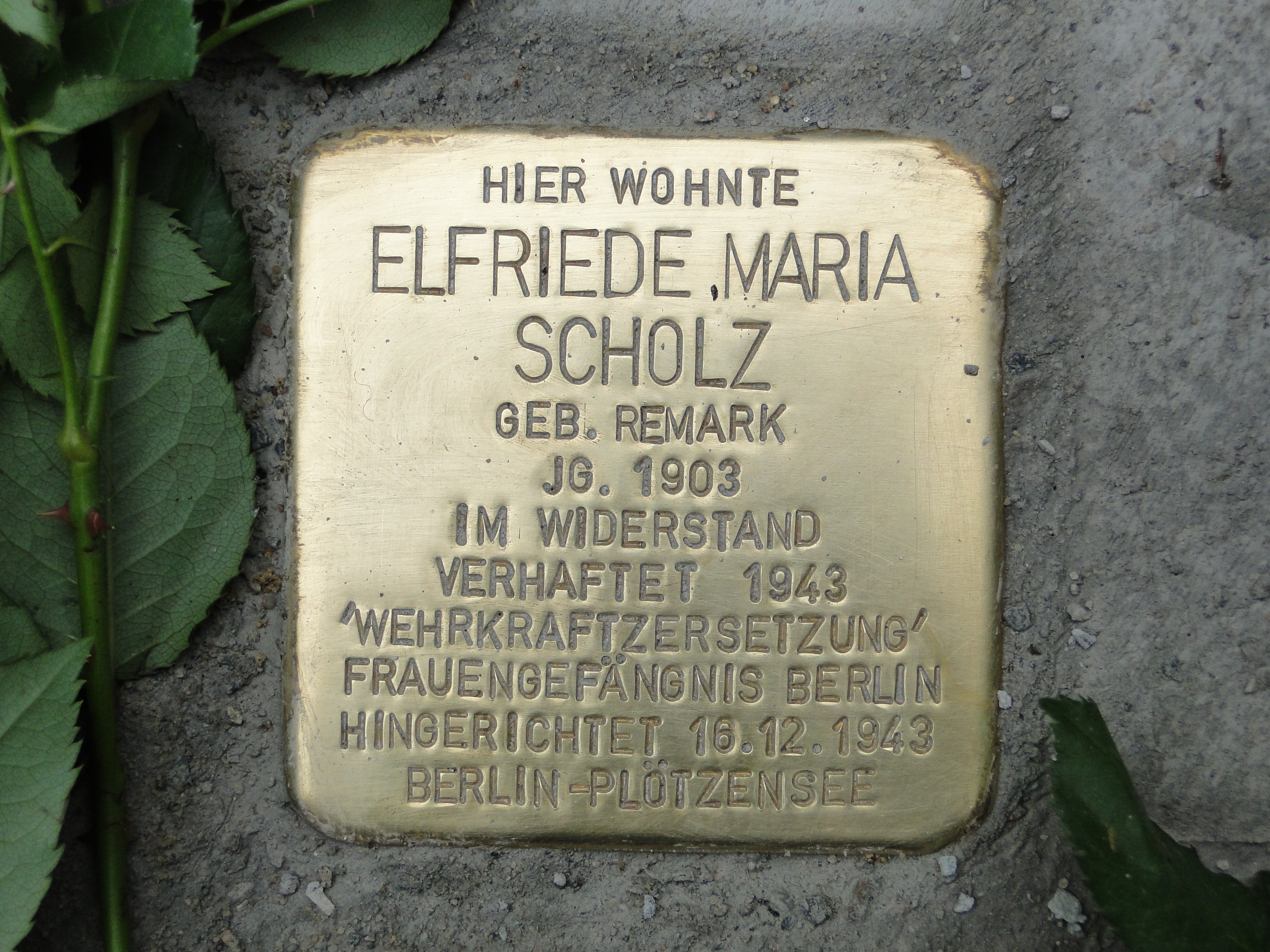
Stolperstein for Elfriede Scholz in Dresden

A memorial plaque dedicated to Elfriede Scholz on the house in Berlin on the Suarezstraße, 31, where she lived for some time, was created in 2013. The plaque was financed by residents of the house (see the photograph).

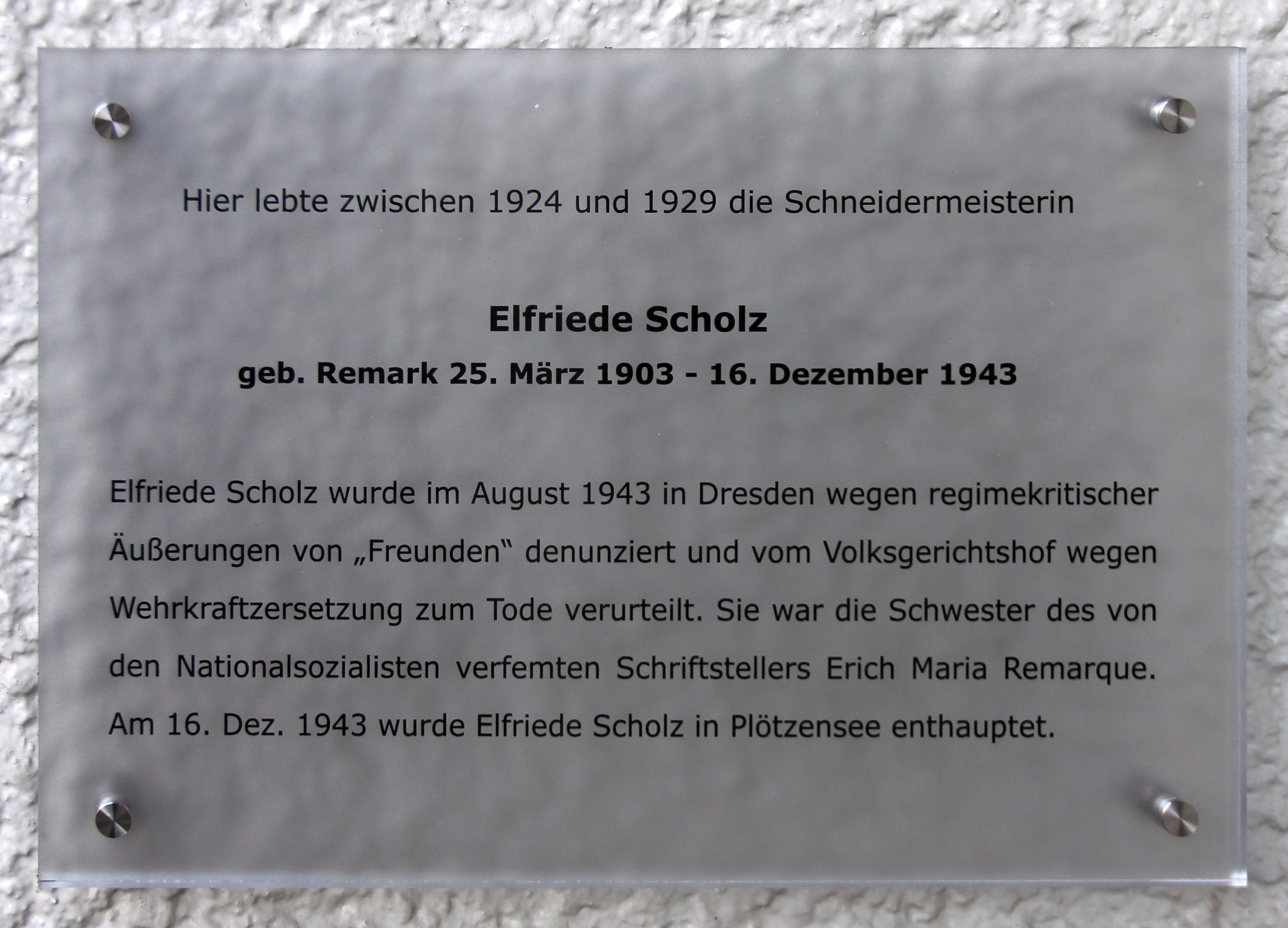
Memorial plaque on the house, Suarezstraße 31, in Berlin-Charlottenburg
