= Bobby Deerfield =

1977 film

- Theatrical release poster
- Directed by: Sydney Pollack
- Screenplay by: Alvin Sargent
- Based on: Heaven Has No Favorites; 1961 novel by Erich Maria Remarque
- Produced by: Sydney Pollack
- Starring: Al Pacino; Marthe Keller; Anny Duperey
- Cinematography: Henri Decaë
- Edited by: Fredric Steinkamp
- Music by: Dave Grusin
- Production companies: Columbia Pictures; Warner Bros. Pictures; First Artists
- Distributed by: Columbia Pictures (United States); Warner Bros. (International)
- Release date: September 29, 1977 (US)
- Running time: 124 minutes
- Country: United States
- Language: English
- Budget: $5.6 million
- Box office: $9,300,000 (US)

Bobby Deerfield is a 1977 American romantic drama film directed by Sydney Pollack and starring Al Pacino and Marthe Keller. Based on Erich Maria Remarque's 1961 novel Heaven Has No Favorites, it is about a famous American race car driver on the European circuit who falls in love with an enigmatic Swiss woman who is terminally ill. Pacino was nominated for a Golden Globe Award for Best Actor – Motion Picture Drama. The movie uses clips from the 1976 Formula One season.

== Plot ==
Formula One auto racer Bobby Deerfield is a calculating, control-obsessed loner who has become used to winning the checkered flag on the track. But when he witnesses a fiery crash that kills a teammate and seriously wounds a competitor, he becomes unsettled by thoughts of death.

During a visit to the survivor, Deerfield's world is further set askew when he meets Lillian Morelli, a quirky, impulsive woman who is racing against time after being diagnosed with terminal cancer.

== Cast ==
- Al Pacino as Bobby Deerfield
- Marthe Keller as Lillian Morelli
- Anny Duperey as Lydia
- Walter McGinn as The Brother
- Romolo Valli as Uncle Luigi
- Stephan Meldegg as Karl Holtzmann
- Jaime Sánchez as Delvecchio
- Norm Nielsen as The Magician
- Mickey Knox as Tourist
- Dorothy James as Tourist
- Guido Alberti as Priest In The Garden
- Monique Lejeune as Catherine Modave
- Steve Gadler as Bertrand Modave
- Van Doude as The Flutist
- Aurora Maris as Woman In The Gas Station
- Gérard Hernandez as Carlos Del Montanaro
- Maurice Vallier as Priest
- Antonino Faà di Bruno as Vincenzo
- André Valardy as Autograph Hound
- Féodor Atkine as Tommy (credited as Fédor Atkine)
- Patrick Floersheim as Mario
- Bernie Pollack as Head Mechanic
- Al Silvani as Mechanic
- Isabelle de Blonay as Nurse
- Franco Ressel as Man With Dog
- Dominique Briand as Reporter

== Reception ==
=== Critical response ===
The film has a 29% rating on Rotten Tomatoes, based on 14 reviews.

Critics panned Bobby Deerfield as an over-the-top melodrama with a plodding story line; audiences reportedly laughed at scenes intended to be dramatic. Race-film fans, expecting another Grand Prix or Le Mans, were disappointed that the story did not play out on the race track. However, the action footage was filmed by racing cinematographers during the 1976 Formula One season and featured actual drivers, including Carlos Pace, Tom Pryce, James Hunt, Patrick Depailler and Mario Andretti.

Vincent Canby of The New York Times said that it "may turn out to be the year's most cynical movie made by people who know better, including Sydney Pollack, the director, and Alvin Sargent, who wrote the screenplay".

Time Out magazine stated that it was a "classic example of a Hollywood director being struck down by a lethal 'art' attack as soon as he sets foot in Europe".

=== Box office & Home Video releases ===
Bobby Deerfield grossed $9,300,000 in the United States on a budget of $5.6 million, failing to recover its costs and classifying it as a flop. The film was released on VHS multiple times, with known releases in the US around 1984 and 1990, and another listing for 1994, distributed by Warner Home Video, and later on DVD in March 2008, from Sony Pictures Home Entertainment. In September 2016, Twilight Time released Bobby Deerfield on Blu-ray as a limited edition of 3,000 copies, with a DTS high-definition audio options, an isolated score and booklet.

=== Awards and nominations ===
- 1978 Golden Globe Award Nomination for Best Motion Picture Actor, Drama (Al Pacino)

== See also ==
- List of American films of 1977
