= Heaven Has No Favorites =

Book by Erich Maria Remarque

- First English-language edition
- Author: Erich Maria Remarque
- Original title: Der Himmel kennt keine Günstlinge
- Translator: Richard and Clara Winston
- Language: German
- Publisher: Harcourt, Brace & World
- Publication date: 1961
- Publication place: Germany
- English publication date: 1961
- Media type: Print (Hardback)
- Pages: 302
- OCLC: 295971

Heaven Has No Favorites (German: Der Himmel kennt keine Günstlinge) is a novel by the German writer Erich Maria Remarque. This novel is a story about passion and love, set in 1948 with a background of automobile racing. Inspired by racing driver Alfonso de Portago.

The novel was serialized in the Hamburg magazine Kristall in 1959 under the title Borrowed Life (German: Geborgtes Leben), and first published in book form in 1961.

== Plot summary ==
The main figure, Clerfayt, is an automobile racer who goes to a Swiss sanatorium to visit a fellow racer, Hollmann, who has tuberculosis. There he meets the young Belgian woman Lillian suffering from tuberculosis. She is in its terminal stage with no chance of a cure, and she wants to enjoy her last months rather than waiting for her death. She has been talking about leaving the hospital for months and has never gone through with it. This changes when a friend of hers dies in that hospital and she realizes that the corpses aren't named, they're given numbers and treated like cargo. Unwilling to become an unnamed body, she decides to leave the Bela Vista sanatorium with Clerfayt after having gone out with him the night before.

Together they travel over Europe, while Lillian indulges in lavish dresses and food, using the money she inherited and that was saved for her by her uncle. Eventually they fall in love and Clerfayt starts to hope for a future with her. However, when he expresses his wish to settle down and wants to get her visited by a doctor, she internally realizes that marrying Clerfayt would be to make him a widower within months and refuses the idea. Although she loves him, she decides to leave him before they start an actual life together. In one race, after the racer in front of him crashes, Clerfayt is seriously injured and dies in the hospital. Lillian, devastated, returns to Switzerland. On her way there she encounters Hollmann, now healed, who has been offered the former job of Clerfayt. Six weeks later, Lillian dies. It is described as a peaceful moment, as if even the landscape had stopped breathing.

== Film adaptation ==
In 1977, a film based on the novel, entitled Bobby Deerfield, was released. Directed by Sydney Pollack with Alvin Sargent adapting the book into a screenplay, it starred Al Pacino as automobile racer Bobby Deerfield and Marthe Keller as Lillian Morelli.
