= Hans Bluntschli =

Swiss anatomist

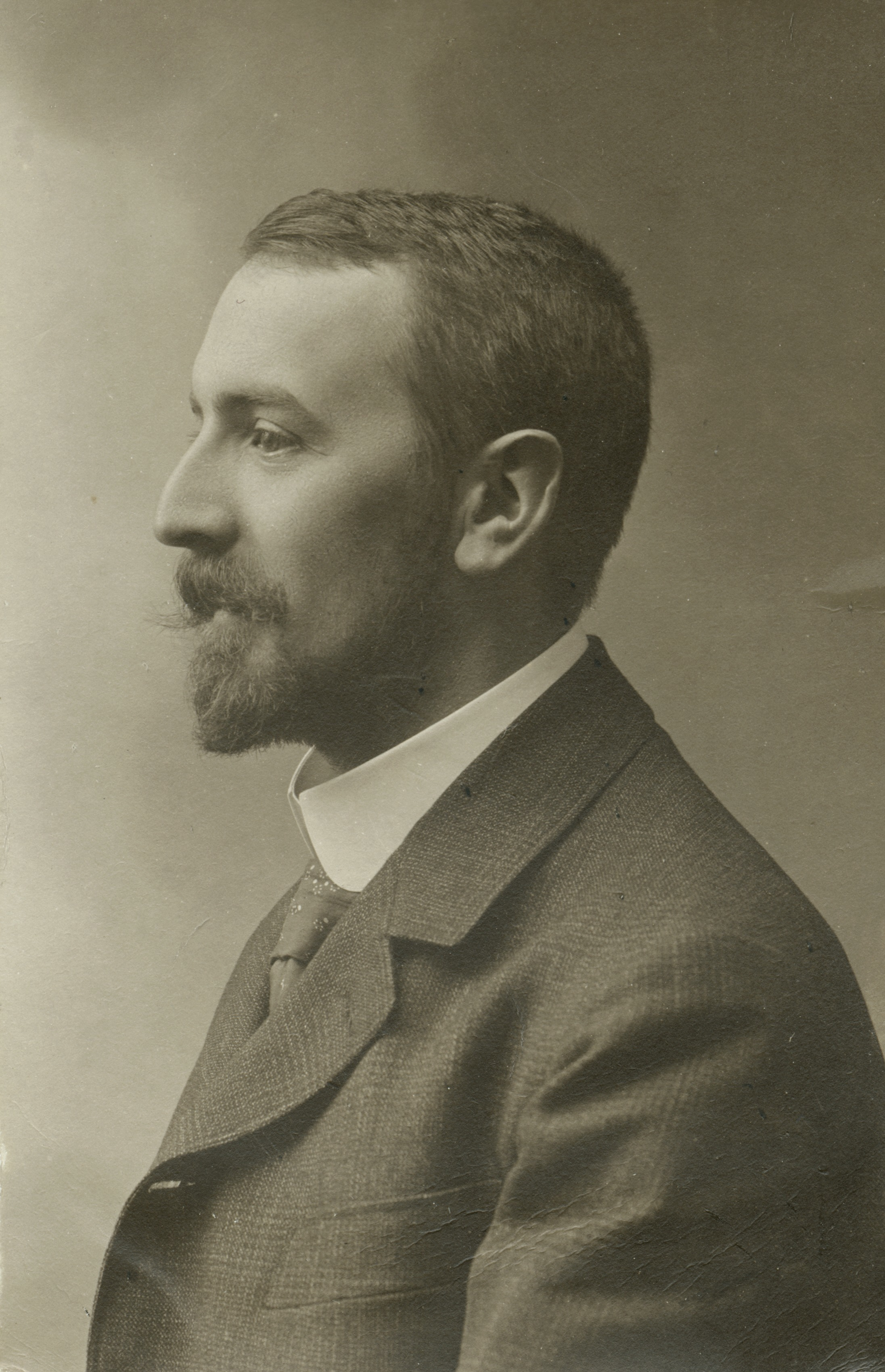
- Hans Bluntschli, c. 1910
- Born: 19 February 1877; Frankfurt, Germany
- Died: 13 July 1962 (aged 85); Bern, Switzerland
- Occupation: anatomist

Hans Bluntschli (19 February 1877 – 13 July 1962) was a Swiss anatomist.

== Education and career ==
Bluntschli was born on 19 February 1877 in Frankfurt. In 1881, his father, who was an architect, moved the family to Zürich. From 1887 he attended the grammar school in Winterthur. The botanist Robert Keller (1854-1939) was a teacher there and exerted a great influence on the young Bluntschli, as Bluntschli himself often emphasized in later years. Keller had studied in Jena and was a big fan of Ernst Haeckel's (1834-1919) zoological and embryological theories. He received his medical degree from Heidelberg University in 1903, and taught at multiple universities before becoming the chair of anatomy and embryology in Bern in 1933, where he succeeded Karl Wilhelm Zimmermann, and where he remained until his retirement in 1942.

His contributions were concentrated on comparative anatomy, morphology and embryology, relating his findings to theories about the process of evolution. On expedition in 1931, he recovered two juvenile specimens of birds, which were identified in 1996 as a distinct species, but were later identified through genetic analysis to be specimens of white-throated oxylabes. His expeditions included the Amazon Rain Forest from 1912 to 1913, and Madagascar from 1932 to 1933, during which he recovered the specimens now know to be white-throated oxylabes.

== Works by and on Hans Bluntschli ==
- Die Arteria femoralis und ihre Äste bei den niederen catarrhinen Affen : eine vergleichend-anatomische Untersuchung ..., Hans Bluntschli, Leipzig 1906.
- Die Bedeutung der Leibesübungen für die gesunde Entwickelung des Körpers : anatomische Betrachtungen in gemeinverständlicher Darstellung, Hans Bluntschli, Munich 1909.
- Der Anatom Hans Bluntschli, 1877-1962 von Fatih Cener, Zürich : Juris Druck, 1990.
- Hans Bluntschli als Morphologe, Rudolf Greif und Hans-Konrad Schmutz, Gesnerus 52 (1995) 133-157.

== See also ==
- List of Swiss people
