= The Dream Room =

Novel by Erich Maria Remarque

First edition

The Dream Room (German: Die Traumbude) was Erich Maria Remarque's first novel, published under the name Erich Remark. He started writing it at the age of sixteen and completed it after his service in World War I, but it was not published until 1920.

In his attic apartment, the painter and poet Fritz Schramm welcomes young people with artistic ambitions. A friendship develops between him and the music student Ernst Winter, a friendship that is put to the test when Ernst falls in love with the opera singer Lanna. Remarque's debut novel is considered a portrait of the artist as a young man and the beginning of an acclaimed literary career.

When he published All Quiet on the Western Front in 1928, Remarque changed his middle name in memory of his mother and reverted to the earlier spelling of the family name to dissociate himself from Die Traumbude. The original family name, Remarque, had been changed to Remark by his grandfather in the 19th century.
