= Station at the Horizon =

1998 novel by Erich Maria Remarque

- First edition
- Author: Erich Maria Remarque
- Original title: Station am Horizont
- Language: German
- Genre: Adventure
- Publisher: Kiepenheuer & Witsch
- Publication date: 1998
- Publication place: Germany
- Media type: Print (Hardback)
- Pages: 228
- OCLC: 40119833

Station at the Horizon (German: Station am Horizont) is a novel by Erich Maria Remarque, a German veteran of World War I. The book describes the search for love of a veteran and former race car driver, Kai, who is torn between Barbara, a girl from the village, Maud, an American middle-class woman, and Lilian Dunquerke, a countess.

The novel was first published in 1927/28, in a German sports magazine Sport im Bild. However, it was not published as a book until 1998.
