= Hermann Rüdisühli =

Swiss painter

Hermann Traugott Rüdisühli 1910

Hermann Traugott Rüdisühli (10 June 1864 – 27 January 1944) was a Swiss painter, a member of the Rüdisühli family of artists. He created more than 1,000 paintings, primarily landscapes, portraits and allegories. He's a landscape painter like his father J. L. Rüdisühli.

He was born in Lenzburg. Like his siblings, Rüdisühli began his artistic training under his father, Jacob Rüdisühli. He later studied at the Kunstgewerbeschule Basel (now the Schule für Gestaltung) and from 1883 to 1887 at the Kunstakademie Karlsruhe (now the Academy of Fine Arts) in Karlsruhe, under Ferdinand Keller and Karl Brünner. From 1888 to 1898 he himself directed art schools in Stuttgart and Basel. He then moved to Munich, where he initially was successful, especially among well-born art patrons.

Like his father and brothers, Rüdisühli was greatly influenced by Arnold Böcklin.

In his later years he was impoverished. He committed suicide in Munich after his flat and studio were destroyed in an air raid during the Second World War.

== Sources ==
- "Hermann Rüdisühli. Ein deutscher Künstler aus der Schweiz". Moderne Kunst 28 (1914) 121–22 (in German).
- Hermann Rüdisühli-Mappe. Eine Auswahl der hervorragendsten Werke des Künstlers in Lichtdruck. Basel / Munich: C. Haushalter, [1899]. (Portfolio of photos).
- Carl Brun, et al., ed. Schweizerisches Künstler-Lexikon. Schweizerischer Kunstverein. 4 vols. Frauenfeld: Huber, 1905–1917. Reprint Nendeln: Kraus, 1982. (in German).
- E. Bénézit, ed., rev. Jacques Busse. Dictionnaire critique et documentaire des peintres, sculpteurs, dessinateurs et graveurs de tous les temps et de tous les pays par un groupe d'écrivains spécialistes français et étrangers. Rev. ed. 14 vols. Paris: Gründ, 1999. (in French).
