= The Black Obelisk =

1956 novel by Erich Maria Remarque

- First edition
- Author: Erich Maria Remarque
- Original title: Der schwarze Obelisk
- Set in: 1923 Germany
- Published: 1956
- Publisher: Kiepenheuer & Witsch
- Pages: 483
- Dewey Decimal: 833/.912

The Black Obelisk (German: Der schwarze Obelisk) is a novel by the German author Erich Maria Remarque published in 1956. The novel was written while Remarque was living in Switzerland and deals with life and politics in Germany during the Weimar Republic. It opens in April 1923, in the middle of the hyperinflation crisis, and closes later in the same year.

An English translation by Denver Lindley was published in 1957.

The novel is the third of Remarque's war novels, after All Quiet on the Western Front and The Road Back, and its plot links with that of the two earlier novels.

== Plot summary ==
Ludwig, the protagonist, is in his mid twenties; just like most of his friends, he is a World War I veteran. Although aspiring to be a poet, he works for a friend, Georg, managing the office of a small tombstone company. He tries to earn some extra money as a private tutor to a son of a bookstore owner, and by playing the organ at the chapel of a local insane asylum.

As a result of his diversity of activities, Ludwig interacts with a wide cross-section of the German population of his town and the surrounding villages. He encounters businessmen and war veterans with a diversity of opinions on contemporary issues.

A lot of events are connected to women. Two of them leave Ludwig, just because he cannot float in the contemporary world of greed and money. He chose to stay "clean", maybe not by himself, but he cannot be anything other than be true to his ideals and now he has to live with that choice. A third woman, probably the most important to him, is Genevieve Terhoven, whom he meets at the insane asylum. She is there for having schizophrenia and considers herself to be "Isabelle" most of the time. Ludwig gets more and more attached to her, feeling a "pure" love for her because she sees the world so differently.

== In popular culture ==
The 1998 Emir Kusturica movie Black Cat, White Cat contains a scene where a lady nicknamed Black Obelisk pulls a nail from a wooden beam using her behind — a direct reference to the Remarque novel where a Frau Beckmann is said to pull off the same feat.

A line from the book, "The death of one man is a tragedy, the death of millions is a statistic" (Aber das ist wohl so, weil ein einzelner immer der Tod ist — und zwei Millionen immer nur eine Statistik.), has become well-known, but is often wrongly attributed to Soviet leader Joseph Stalin.
