= Center for Anatomy of the Charité =

Education institute in Berlin, Germany

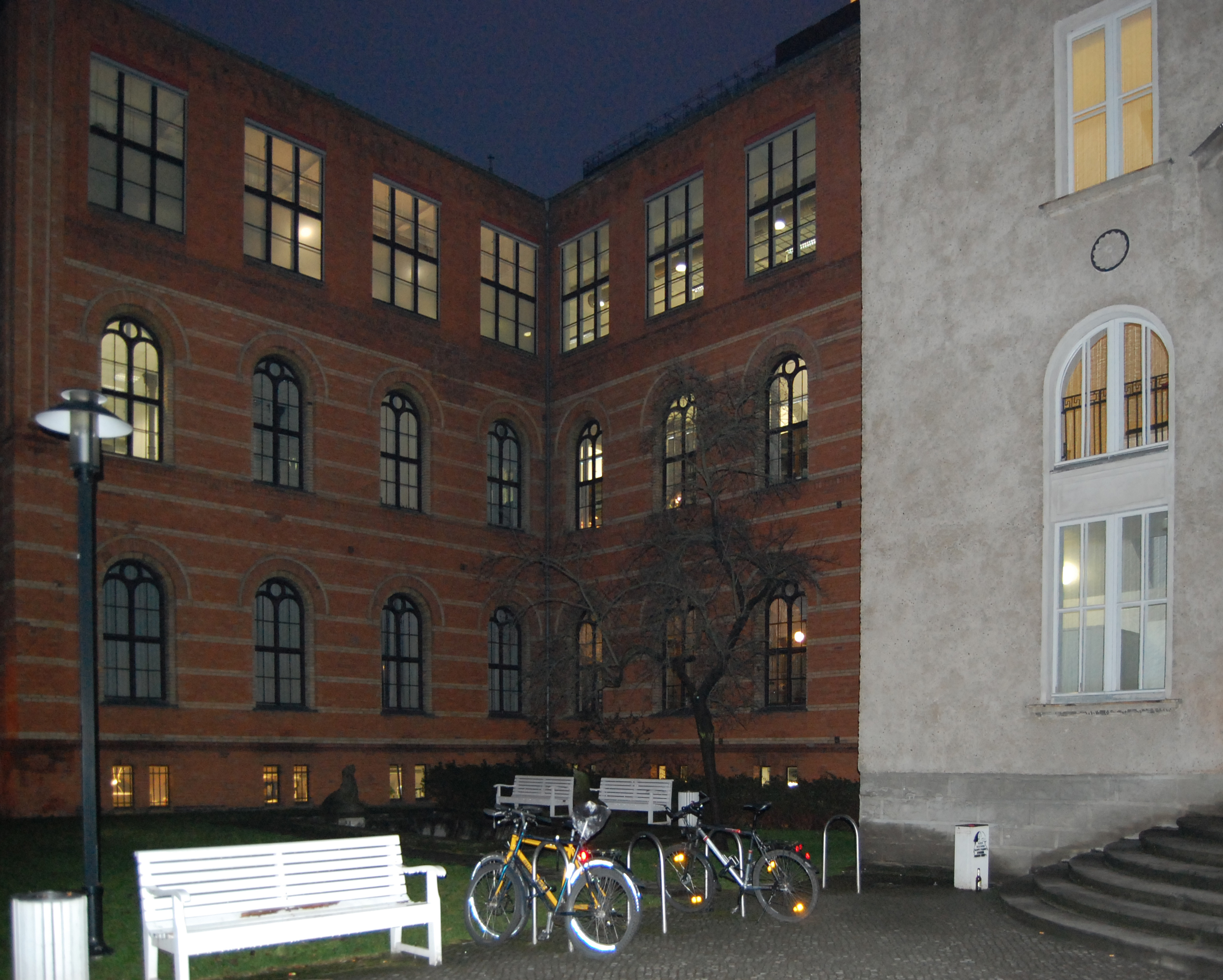
Left wing of the Center for Anatomy of the Charité building - the Waldeyer-Haus.

The Center for Anatomy of the Charité is one of the centers of the Universitätsmedizin Berlin Charité in Berlin whose primary goals are anatomy teaching and research.

It is part of Charité Center 2 for basic medicine and is composed of 3 institutes - Institute of Integrative Anatomy, Institute of Cell Biology and Neurobiology, Institute of Vegetative Anatomy. It has a long history.

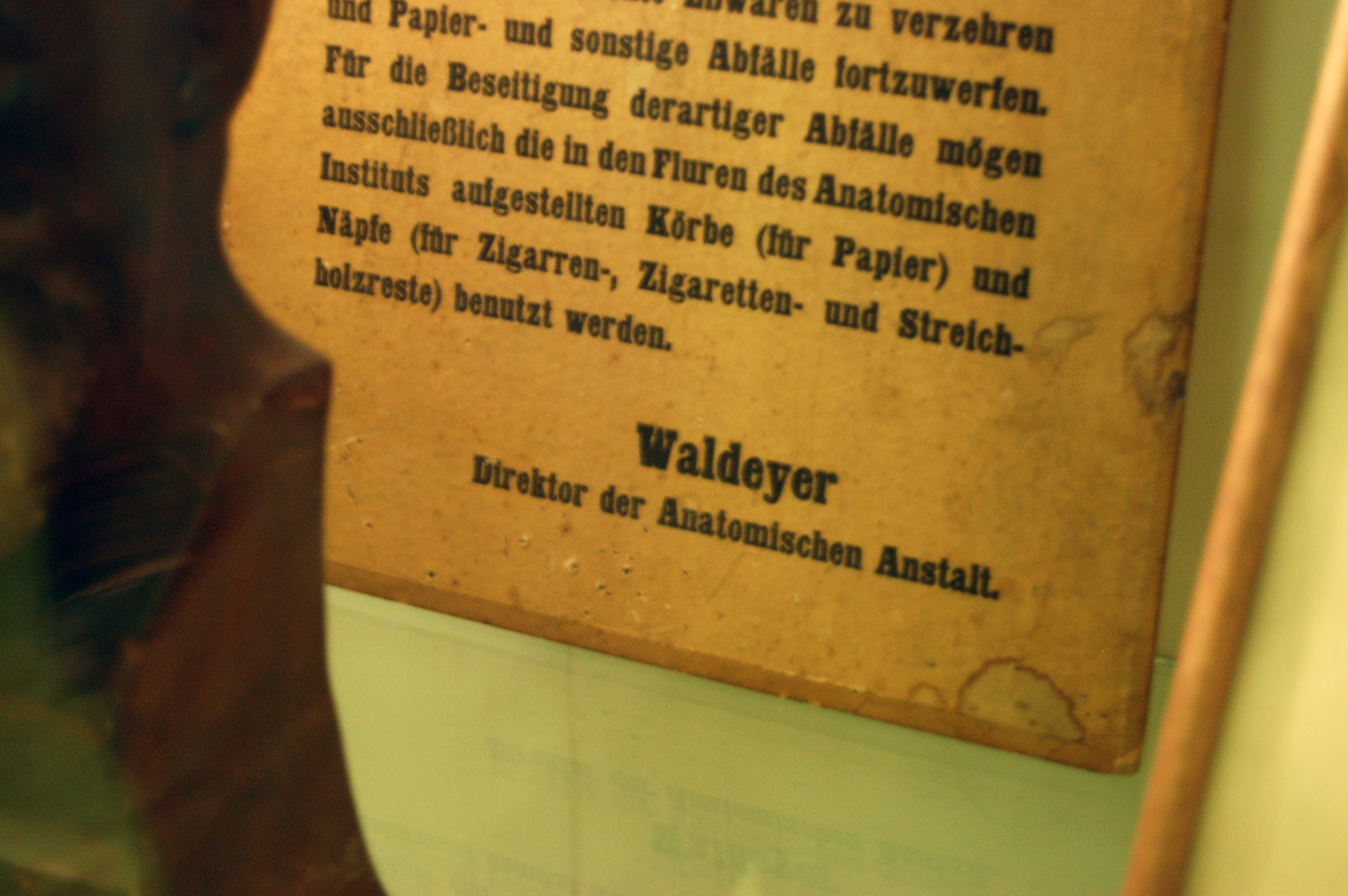
Sign with Waldeyer's signature

== History ==
Past directors: Christian Max Spener (1713–1714), Heinrich Henrici (1714–1723), August Buddeus (1696–1753), Johann Friedrich Meckel, the Elder (1753–1773), Johann Gottlieb Walter (1773–1810), Karl Bogislaus Reichert (until 1883), Heinrich Wilhelm Waldeyer, Rudolph Fick (1917–1952), Hermann Stieve (1946–1949), Friedrich Wilhelm Kopsch (1946–1949), Anton Johannes Waldeyer (1954–1966).

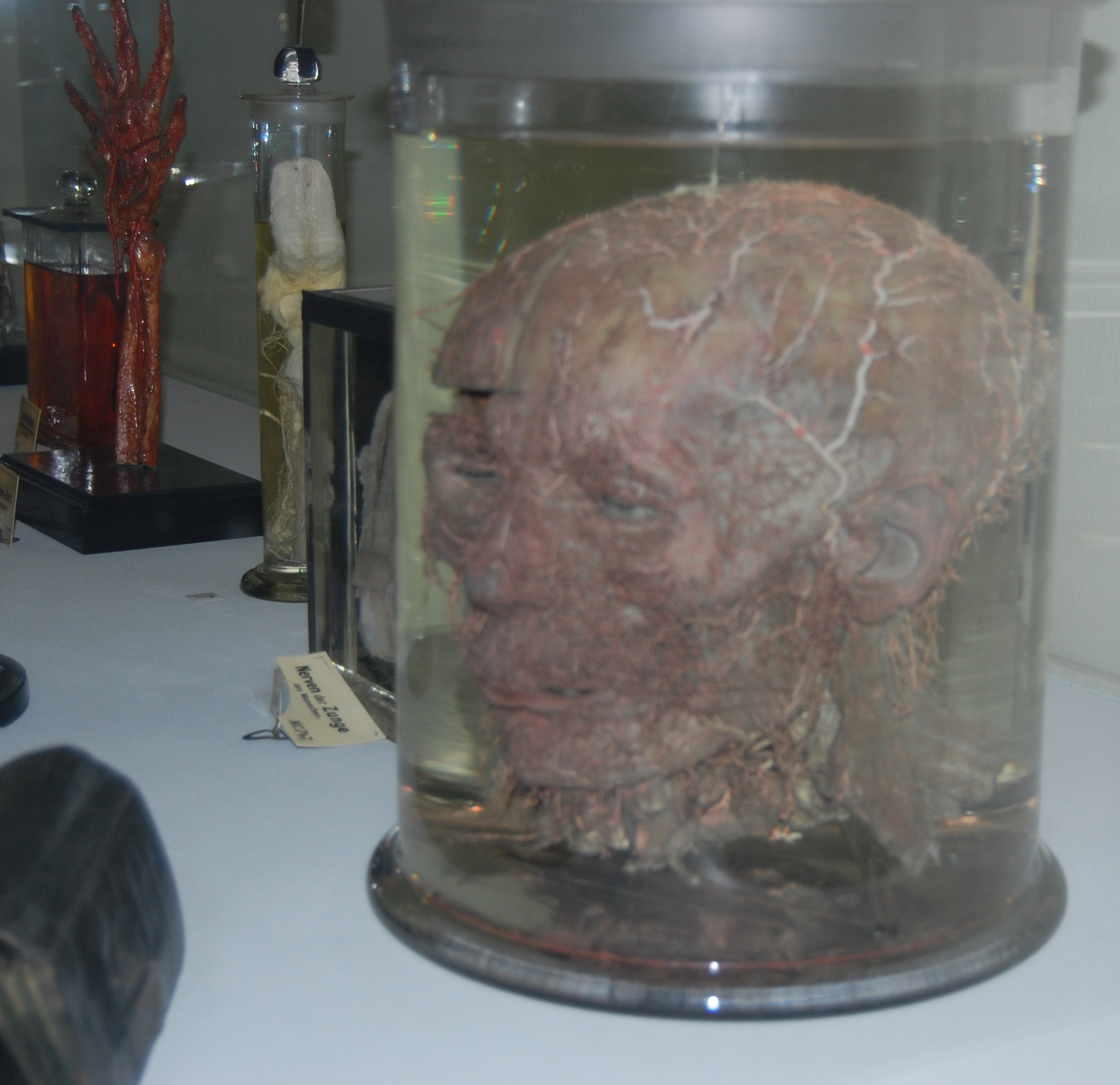
Skull with visible arteries prepared by anatomist Friedrich Schlemm

Friedrich Schlemm (1795–1858) was full professor of anatomy in the University of Berlin since 1833.

== Bibliography ==
- Andreas Winkelmann, 2008, Schlemm, the body snatcher?, Ann. Anat., 190, 3, 223–229, doi = 10.1016/j.aanat.2007.12.002
- Andreas Winkelmann, Wilhelm von Waldeyer-Hartz (1836–1921): an anatomist who left his mark, 2007, Clinical anatomy, doi=10.1002/ca.20400, 20, 231–234.
