= Rüdisühli =

Swiss artistic family

The Rüdisühli family was a Swiss family of artists, including painters, engravers and copyists, who were active from the mid-19th to the mid-20th Century.

The family was from the Basel area. Jacob Rüdisühli was primarily a painter of landscapes and of sentimental works influenced by Arnold Böcklin. Four of his fourteen children, Hermann, Louise, Michael and Eduard, received their first training from him. The three sons all subsequently attended the Kunstgewerbeschule Basel (now the Schule für Gestaltung), his daughter Louise became a largely self-taught painter of portraits and landscapes; unlike her brothers', her work does not echo the motifs of Böcklin.

The Rüdisühli family's works were once fashionable, but fell out of critical favour by the end of the First World War; however, they were still being reproduced into the 1930s. Johannes Neckermann, a son of the dressage rider and businessman Josef Neckermann, collected them, particularly work by Hermann Rüdisühli, for more than 25 years; an exhibition of his collection in 2001–02 at the Yager Museum of Art & Culture at Hartwick College in Oneonta, New York, was the first exhibition in 105 years to reunite works of the whole family. Neckermann's art collection was sold at auction in 2009.

- Jacob Rüdisühli (16 October 1835, Frümsen – 23 November 1918, Basel)
- Hermann Rüdisühli (10 June 1864, Lenzburg – 27 January 1944, Munich)
- Louise Rüdisühli (5 June 1867, Lenzburg – 21 April 1928, Basel)
- Michael Rüdisühli (24 April 1874, Basel, – 17 January 1923, Basel)
- Eduard Rüdisühli (26 June 1875, Basel – 15 December 1938, Rorschacherberg)

== Sources ==
- Carl Brun, et al., ed. Schweizerisches Künstler-Lexikon. Schweizerischer Kunstverein. 4 vols. Frauenfeld: Huber, 1905–1917. Reprint Nendeln: Kraus, 1982. (in German)
- E. Bénézit, ed., rev. Jacques Busse. Dictionnaire critique et documentaire des peintres, sculpteurs, dessinateurs et graveurs de tous les temps et de tous les pays par un groupe d'écrivains spécialistes français et étrangers. Rev. ed. 14 vols. Paris: Gründ, 1999. (in French)
