= Erich Hintzsche =

Swiss physician and historian

- Born: 26 August 1900; Halberstadt, Germany
- Died: 20 July 1975 (aged 74); Spiegel BE, Switzerland
- Citizenship: Swiss
- Education: University of Halle
- Known for: hist studies on Albrecht von Haller's contribution to medicine history
- Scientific career
- Fields: History of Medicine
- Workplaces: University of Berne
- Doctoral advisor: Hermann Stieve

Erich Hintzsche (26 August 1900 – 20 July 1975) was a Swiss physician and historian most notable for his studies on Albrecht von Haller's contribution to medicine history.

== Publications ==
- Guilelmus Fabricius Hildanus. Rheinischer Kreis, November 6, 1982, Hilden.
- Editor of Albrecht von Hallers Briefe an Auguste Tissot [?]: 1754-1777. Bern/Stuttgart/Wien: Huber, 1977. ISBN 3-456-80507-1 (review, Journal of the History of Medicine and Allied Sciences Book Reviews, vol.XXII, Nr.2, p. 205-206, 1967.
- Editor of “Albrecht Hallers Tagebücher seiner Reisen nach Deutschland, Holland und England: 1723-1727”, Berner Beiträge zur Geschichte der Medizin und der Naturwissenschaften, vol. 4. Bern/Stuttgart/Wien: Huber, 1971.
- “Medizin und Mediziner seit 1870”, Schweizerische Medizinische Wochenschrift, Basel/Stuttgart: Schwabe AG, 1971. ISBN 3-7965-0572-4
- Editor of: Albrecht von Haller: Tagebuch seiner Studienreise nach London, Paris, Strassburg und Basel: 1727 - 1728. Berner Beiträge zur Geschichte der Medizin und der Naturwissenschaften, vol. 2. Bern/Stuttgart: Huber, 1968.
- With Hermann Rennefahrt. 600 Jahre Inselspital: 1354-1954. Bern: Hans Huber, 1954.
