= Fledder =

District of Osnabrück, Germany

Coordinates: 52.2669°N 8.0723°E

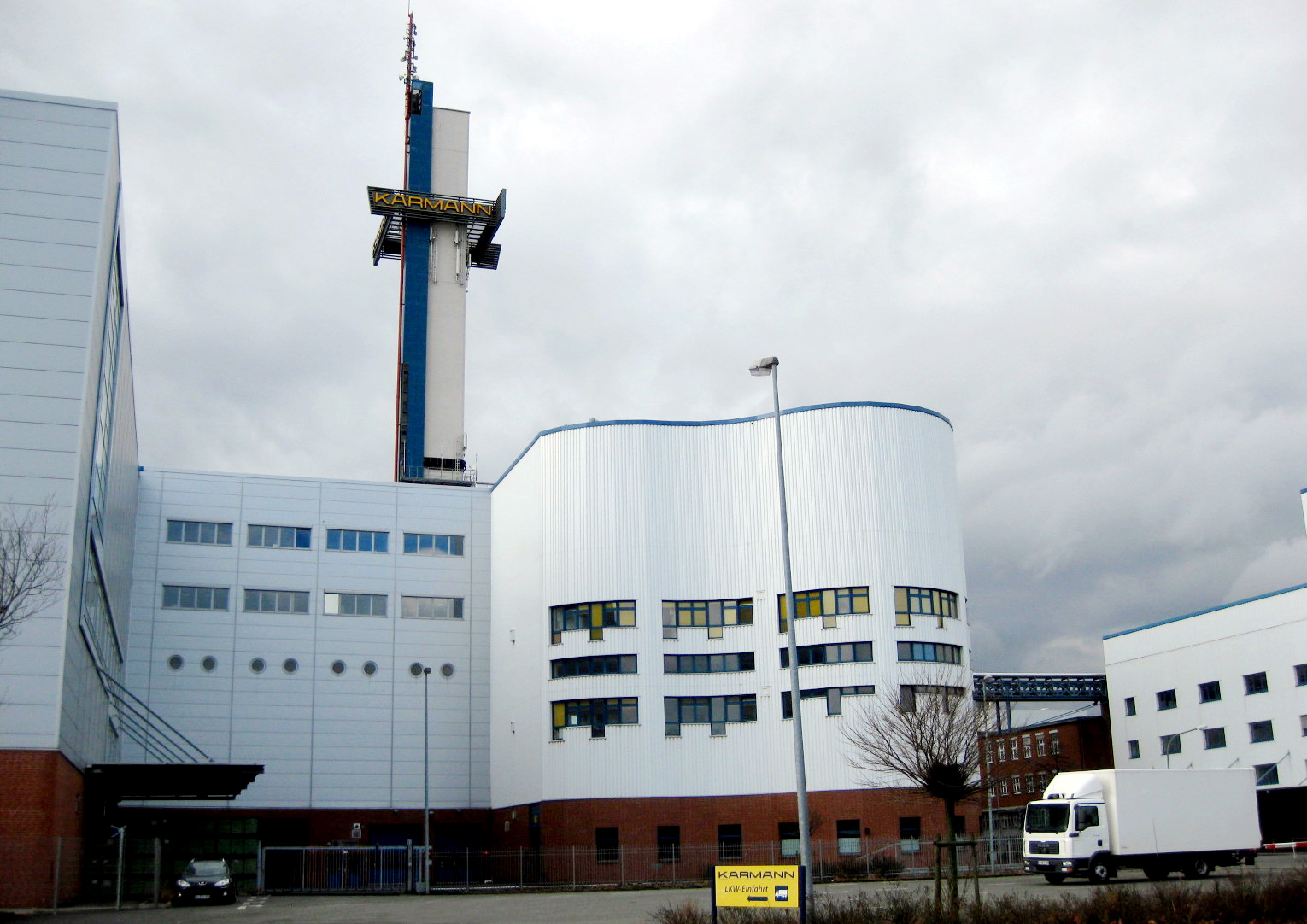
Karmann building

Fledder is a district in the east of Osnabrück, Germany, characterised by its large prevalence of industrial estates. Despite being the location of numerous businesses and large supermarkets the district has comparatively few residential buildings; its population is roughly 2,590.

In 1912, a centrally located shunting yard was set up between the factory of the car manufacturer Karmann and the former Klöckner steelworks. It was substantially expanded and modernised during the 1960s, however its overall capacity soon became insufficient. In 1962, the Fledder district was formally designated an industrial zone by the city council of Osnabrück.

The idea of transforming the area into a cohesive wholesale centre originally came from Dr. Hans—Achim Kastan, leader of the wholesale association. After Osnabrück's old wholesaling quarter – situated between the main train station and the city centre – was dissected by the extension of the inner ring road causing mounting transport problems.

At the beginning of the 1960s, Dr. Castan began to devise plans for a new wholesale centre based in Fledder. Following long-lasting negotiations with – among others - the city council regarding property matters and plans for development, the wholesalers themselves who needed to be won over to the project, and also with the Federal Ministry of Economics and credit institutes regarding issues of financing, Castan was able to guarantee relatively fast development of the wholesale centre. Numerous businesses were quick to settle in the area afterwards, necessitating a railway siding as well as road links. This led to further expansion of the shunting yard. The haulage and logistics firm Meyer & Meyer is based in Fledder – founded in 1902, it employs around 2,300 people today.

The district's name links back to the old term used for the lowland area to the southwest of the city centre. Due to its lowness and moisture, this area was only used for pasturage. The term "Fladder" was used to denote such moorland only thinly covered with soil. Locally the area tends to be referred to as der Fledder (the Fledder).

There is a round bunker from World War II located on Schellenbergstraße near the Schellenbergbrücke. The surrounding area is today the property of Karmann. In addition, there was also an air-raid protection tower known as Kiebitzheide, which was eventually pulled down. An old high-rise bunker still stands on the corner of Stahlwerksweg and Bielefelder Straße; today various businesses use it for office space and workshops. Fledder is also home to two mosques.

== Meaning of name ==
A Fladder or Fledder is an area of brittle, wet grassland or a stretch of land where water is able to spread without infiltrating easily.

== Links ==
- City of Osnabrück, Referat für Stadtentwicklung und Bürgerbeteiligung – statistics -, 4/2008 (PDF file, 1.49 MB)
- City of Osnabrück, Referat für Stadtentwicklung und Bürgerbeteiligung – statistics -, 11/2009 (PDF file, 35.4 KB)
