= Flotsam (novel) =

1939 novel by Erich Maria Remarque

- First US edition
- Author: Erich Maria Remarque
- Original title: Liebe deinen Nächsten
- Translator: Denver Lindley
- Language: German
- Genre: War novel
- Publisher: Little, Brown (US); Hutchinson (UK)
- Publication date: September 1939 in Collier's Weekly; March 1941 Little, Brown and Company
- ISBN: 0-449-91247-7

Flotsam (German: Liebe deinen Nächsten, lit. 'Love thy neighbor') is a novel by the German author Erich Maria Remarque. First published from 8 July to 23 September 1939 as an advance print in Collier's Weekly magazine, the book edition of the revised text followed in March 1941 and was published by Little, Brown and Company. The novel describes the interwoven stories of several immigrants who left Germany at the time of National Socialism.

== Plot ==
The Austrian police raids a boarding house somewhere in Vienna. The young boy Kern and the sagacious Josef Steiner are arrested and evicted for having no passports. In Prague Kern meets Ruth Holland and falls in love with her. The three immigrants are forced to travel through all of Europe in search of a better life. At the end of this odyssey Steiner dies in Germany while he visits his terminally ill wife for the last time. Kern and Ruth are leaving Paris on a train to Spain.

== Film ==
In 1941, the novel was made into the American film So Ends Our Night starring Fredric March and Margaret Sullavan.
