= Spark of Life (novel) =

1952 novel by Erich Maria Remarque

- First US edition
- Author: Erich Maria Remarque
- Language: German
- Series: N/A
- Subject: Holocaust
- Publisher: Kiepenheuer & Witsch
- Publication date: 1952
- Publication place: Germany
- English publication date: 1952 Hutchinson (UK); Appleton-Century-Crofts (US)
- Media type: Print
- ISBN: 978-0-449-91251-5

Spark of Life is a concentration camp novel, written by Erich Maria Remarque in the year 1952.

== Contents ==
The novel has 25 chapters and tells the story of inmates and watchmen of the "Little Camp" of the fictional concentration camp Mellern, a few months before the end of World War II. The Little Camp is a part of the concentration camp, which prisoners who are unable to work are sent to. In the recurring bombardments of the nearby city, a group of inmates of the Little Camp, called veterans for their years of stay, begin to organize themselves as they see signs of possible liberation. This begins with disobeying orders, hiding other prisoners in order to escape the grasp of the guards, obtaining weapons and finally culminates in an armed struggle to liberate the camp. Both the inhumane conditions of the camp, such as humiliations, shootings, unsanitary conditions and hunger, as well as criminals of middle-class background are displayed. An additional element is the conflict with the communistic part of the resistance group and their goals.

== Background ==
Shortly after Remarque in June 1946 learned of the death of Elfriede Scholz, his youngest sister, who had been beheaded after a trial of the People's Court in 1943, he began work on the novel, which he had dedicated to her. The novel is based on the books and conversations with survivors, such as Edgar Kupfer and Toto Koopman. Among the books were Willi Bredel's The Trial, the novel The Seventh Cross by Anna Seghers, and the analysis The SS-State, written by Eugen Kogon, which Remarque did not read until 1950. In addition, he was motivated by the lack of denazification and reassessment of history in postwar of Germany and Austria. The idea and details dragged on until 1950, because he lacked materials and had to rely on information from third parties. He had to restart the novel three times, and contracts with publishers had to be rewritten. Against his inner conviction as an authentic author, Remarque felt himself compelled to explain his project in various prefaces and drafts.

== See also ==
- Erich Maria Remarque
- Nazi concentration camp
