= Shadows in Paradise (novel) =

1971 novel by Erich Maria Remarque

- Author: Erich Maria Remarque
- Original title: Schatten im Paradies
- Translator: Ralph Manheim
- Language: German
- Genre: Fiction
- Publisher: Droemer Knaur
- Publication date: 1971
- Publication place: Germany
- English publication date: 1972
- Media type: Print (hardback)
- Pages: 399
- ISBN: 978-3-426-08996-5
- OCLC: 272289
- LC Class: PT2635.E68 S3 1971

Shadows in Paradise (German: Schatten im Paradies) is a 1971 novel by Erich Maria Remarque. It is about a journalist, Robert Ross, who spent two years evading the Holocaust hiding in an art museum, flees from Europe to the United States and settles in New York. He meets a woman named Natasha, begins a new career as an art dealer and travels to Hollywood. After the war is over, Ross eventually leaves the States. The book was cited for having a tone of "lambent gray romanticism". An English translation by Ralph Manheim was published by Harcourt Brace Jovanovich in 1972.
