= Erich Maria Remarque =

German novelist (1898–1970)

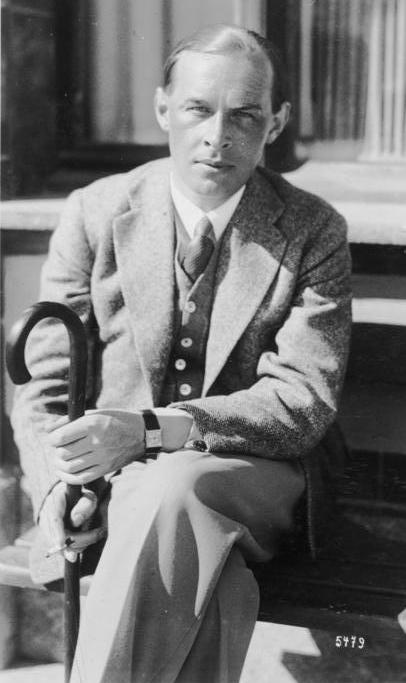
- Remarque in 1929
- Born: Erich Paul Remark; 22 June 1898; Osnabrück, Germany
- Died: 25 September 1970 (aged 72); Locarno, Switzerland
- Citizenship: Germany (1898–1938); Stateless (1938–1947); United States (1947–1970)
- Occupation: Novelist
- Spouses: Ilse Jutta Zambona (m. 1925; div. 1930) (m. 1938; div. 1957) Paulette Goddard (m. 1958)
- Writing career
- Notable work: All Quiet on the Western Front
- Movements: Military fiction Exilliteratur
- Military service
- Allegiance: Germany
- Branch: Imperial German Army
- Service years: 1916–1919
- Units: 2nd Guards Reserve Division; 15th Reserve Infantry Division
- Conflicts: World War I

Erich Maria Remarque (/rəˈmɑːrk/; German: [ˈeːʁɪç maˈʁiːa ʁəˈmaʁk]; born Erich Paul Remark; 22 June 1898 – 25 September 1970) was a German novelist. His 1928 landmark novel All Quiet on the Western Front, which was based on his experience in the Imperial German Army during World War I, was an international bestseller which created a new literary genre of veterans writing about conflict. The book was adapted to film several times. Remarque's anti-war themes led to his condemnation by Nazi propaganda minister Joseph Goebbels as "unpatriotic". He was able to use his literary success and fame to relocate to Switzerland as a refugee, and to the United States, where he became a naturalized citizen.

== Early life ==
Remarque was born on 22 June 1898, as Erich Paul Remark, to Peter Franz Remark (1867–1954) and Anna Maria née Stallknecht (1871–1917), a working-class Roman Catholic family in Osnabrück. He was never close with his father, a bookbinder, but he was close with his mother and he began using her middle name Maria, after World War I, in her honor. Remarque was the second of four children. His siblings were his older brother Theodor Arthur (1896–1901), who died at the age of five, and his younger sisters Erna (1900–1978) and Elfriede Maria (1903–1943).

The spelling of his last name was changed to Remarque when he published All Quiet on the Western Front in honor of his French ancestors and in order to disassociate himself from his earlier novel The Dream Room (Die Traumbude). His grandfather had changed the spelling from Remarque to Remark in the 19th century. Research by Remarque's childhood and lifelong friend Hanns-Gerd Rabe proved that Remarque had French ancestors – his great-grandfather Johann Adam Remarque, who was born in 1789, came from a French family in Aachen. This is contrary to the falsehood, perpetuated by Nazi propaganda, that his real surname was Kramer ("Remark" spelled backwards) and that he was Jewish.

== Military service ==
During World War I, Remarque was conscripted into the Imperial German Army at the age of 18. On 12 June 1917, he was transferred to the Western Front, 2nd Company, Reserves, Field Depot of the 2nd Guards Reserve Division at Hem-Lenglet. On 26 June 1917 he was posted to the 15th Reserve Infantry Regiment, 2nd Company, Engineer Platoon Bethe, and fought in the trenches between Torhout and Houthulst. On 31 July 1917 he was wounded by shell shrapnel in his left leg, right arm and neck, and after being medically evacuated from the field was sent to an army hospital in Duisburg, where he recovered from his wounds. In October 1918, he was recalled to military service. In mid-November 1918, he received the Iron Cross First Class. On 5 January 1919, he was released from service.

== Post-war employment ==
After the war he continued his teacher training and worked from 1 August 1919 as a primary-school teacher in Lohne, at that time in the county of Lingen, now in the county of Bentheim. From May 1920 he worked in Klein Berssen in the former County of Hümmling, now Emsland, and from August 1920 in Nahne, which has been a part of Osnabrück since 1972. On 20 November 1920 he applied for a leave of absence from teaching.

He worked at a number of different jobs in this phase of his life, including librarian, businessman, journalist, and editor. His first paid writing job was as a technical writer for the Continental Rubber Company, a German tire manufacturer.

== Writing career ==
Remarque had made his first attempts at writing at the age of 16. Among them were essays, poems, and the beginnings of a novel that was finished later and published in 1920 as The Dream Room (Die Traumbude). Between 1923 and 1926 he also scripted a comic series, Die Contibuben, drawn by Hermann Schütz, published in the magazine Echo Continental, a publication by the rubber and tire company Continental AG.

After coming back from the war, the atrocities of war along with his mother's death caused him a great deal of mental trauma and grief. In later years as a professional writer, he started using "Maria" as his middle name instead of "Paul", to commemorate his mother. When he published All Quiet on the Western Front, he had his surname reverted to an earlier spelling – from Remark to Remarque – to disassociate himself from his novel Die Traumbude.

In 1927, he published the novel Station at the Horizon (Station am Horizont). It was serialised in the sports journal Sport im Bild for which Remarque was working. (It was first published in book form in 1998.) All Quiet on the Western Front (Im Westen nichts Neues) (1929), his career-defining work, was also written in 1927. Remarque was at first unable to find a publisher for it. Its text described the experiences of German soldiers during World War I. On publication it became an international bestseller and a landmark work in twentieth-century literature. It inspired a new genre of veterans writing about conflict, and the commercial publication of a wide variety of war memoirs. It also inspired dramatic representations of the war in theatre and cinema, in Germany as well as in countries that had fought in the conflict against the German Empire, particularly the United Kingdom and the United States.

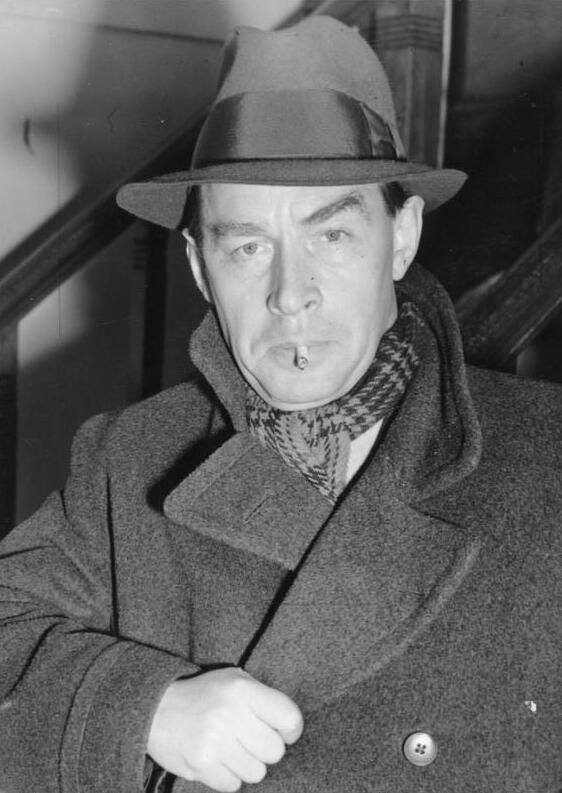
Remarque in 1939

Riding on the tail of the success of All Quiet on the Western Front, a number of similar works followed from Remarque. In simple, emotive language, they described wartime and the postwar years in Germany. In 1931, after finishing The Road Back (Der Weg zurück), he bought a villa (Casa Monte Tabor) in Ronco, Switzerland with the substantial financial wealth that his published works had brought him. He planned to live both there and in France.

On 10 May 1933, at the initiative of the Nazi propaganda minister Joseph Goebbels, Remarque's writing was publicly declared as "unpatriotic" and was banned in Germany. Copies were removed from all libraries and restricted from being sold or published anywhere in the country.

Germany was rapidly descending into a totalitarian society, leading to mass arrests of elements of the population of which the new governing order disapproved. Remarque left Germany to live at his villa in Switzerland. His French background as well as his Catholic faith were also publicly attacked by the Nazis. They continued to decry his writings in his absence, proclaiming that anyone who would change the spelling of his name from the German "Remark" to the French "Remarque" could not be a true German. The Nazis further made the false claim that Remarque had not seen active service during World War I. In 1938, Remarque's German citizenship was revoked. In 1938, he and his ex-wife were remarried to prevent her repatriation to Germany. Just before the outbreak of World War II in Europe, they left Porto Ronco, Switzerland, for the United States. They became naturalised citizens of the United States in 1947.

Remarque continued to write about the German experience after WWI. His next novel, Three Comrades (Drei Kameraden), focuses on life in Weimar Republic in the years of 1928 and 1929. His fourth novel, Flotsam (in German titled Liebe deinen Nächsten, or Love Thy Neighbour), first appeared in a serial version in English translation in Collier's magazine in 1939. He spent another year revising the text for its book publication in 1941, both in English and German. His next work, the novel Arch of Triumph, was first published in 1945 in English, and the next year in German as Arc de Triomphe. Another instant bestseller, it reached worldwide sales of nearly five million. In 1943, the Nazis arrested his youngest sister, Elfriede Scholz, who had stayed behind in Germany with her husband. After a trial at the notorious Volksgerichtshof (Hitler's extra-constitutional "People's Court"), she was found guilty of "undermining morale" for stating that she considered the war lost. Court President Roland Freisler declared, "Ihr Bruder ist uns leider entwischt—Sie aber werden uns nicht entwischen" ("Your brother is unfortunately beyond our reach – you, however, will not escape us"). Scholz was beheaded on 16 December 1943. Remarque later said that his sister had been involved in anti-Nazi resistance activities.

In exile, Remarque was unaware of his sister Elfriede's fate until after the war. He would dedicate his 1952 novel Spark of Life (Der Funke Leben) to her. The dedication was omitted in the German version of the book, reportedly because he was still seen as a traitor by some Germans.

His final novel was Shadows in Paradise. He wrote it while living at 320 East 57th Street in New York City. The apartment building "played a prominent role in his novel".

== Later years ==
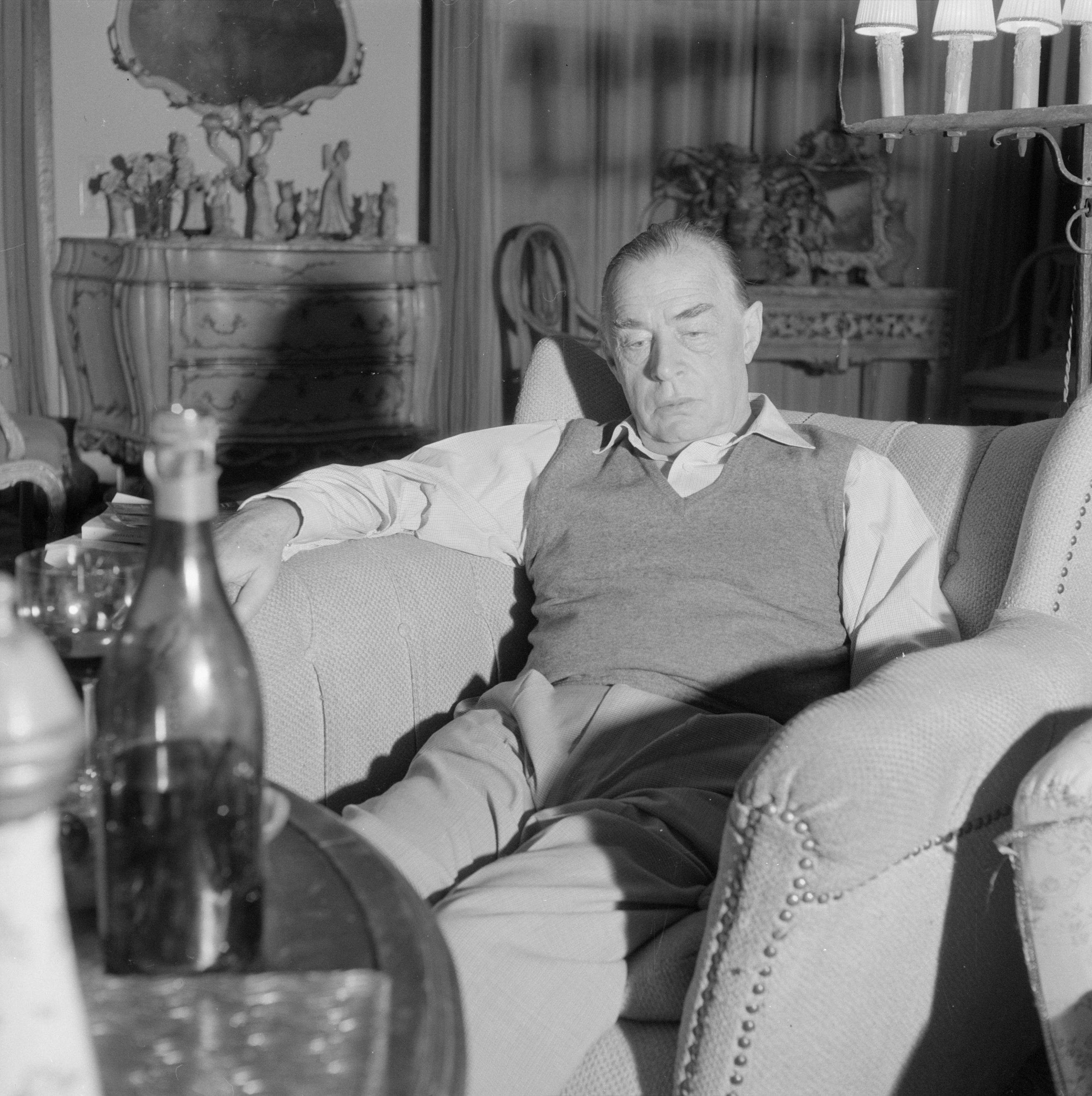
Remarque in 1961

In 1948, Remarque returned to Switzerland, where he spent the remainder of his life. There was a gap of seven years – a long silence for Remarque – between Arch of Triumph and his next work, Spark of Life (Der Funke Leben), which appeared both in German and in English in 1952. While he was writing The Spark of Life he was also working on a novel Zeit zu leben und Zeit zu sterben (Time to Live and Time to Die). It was published first in English translation in 1954 with the not-quite-literal title A Time to Love and a Time to Die. In 1958, Douglas Sirk directed the film A Time to Love and a Time to Die in Germany, based on Remarque's novel. Remarque appeared in the film as an honorable teacher in hiding from the Nazis.

In 1955, Remarque wrote the screenplay for an Austrian film The Last Act (Der letzte Akt), about Hitler's final days in the bunker of the Reich Chancellery in Berlin, which was based on the book Ten Days to Die (1950) by Michael Musmanno. In 1956, Remarque wrote a drama Full Circle (Die letzte Station) for the stage, which played in both Germany and on Broadway. An English translation was published in 1974. Heaven Has No Favorites was serialised (as Borrowed Life) in 1959 before appearing as a book in 1961 and was made into the 1977 film Bobby Deerfield. The Night in Lisbon (Die Nacht von Lissabon), published in 1962, is the last work Remarque finished. The novel sold about 900,000 copies in Germany.

== Personal life ==
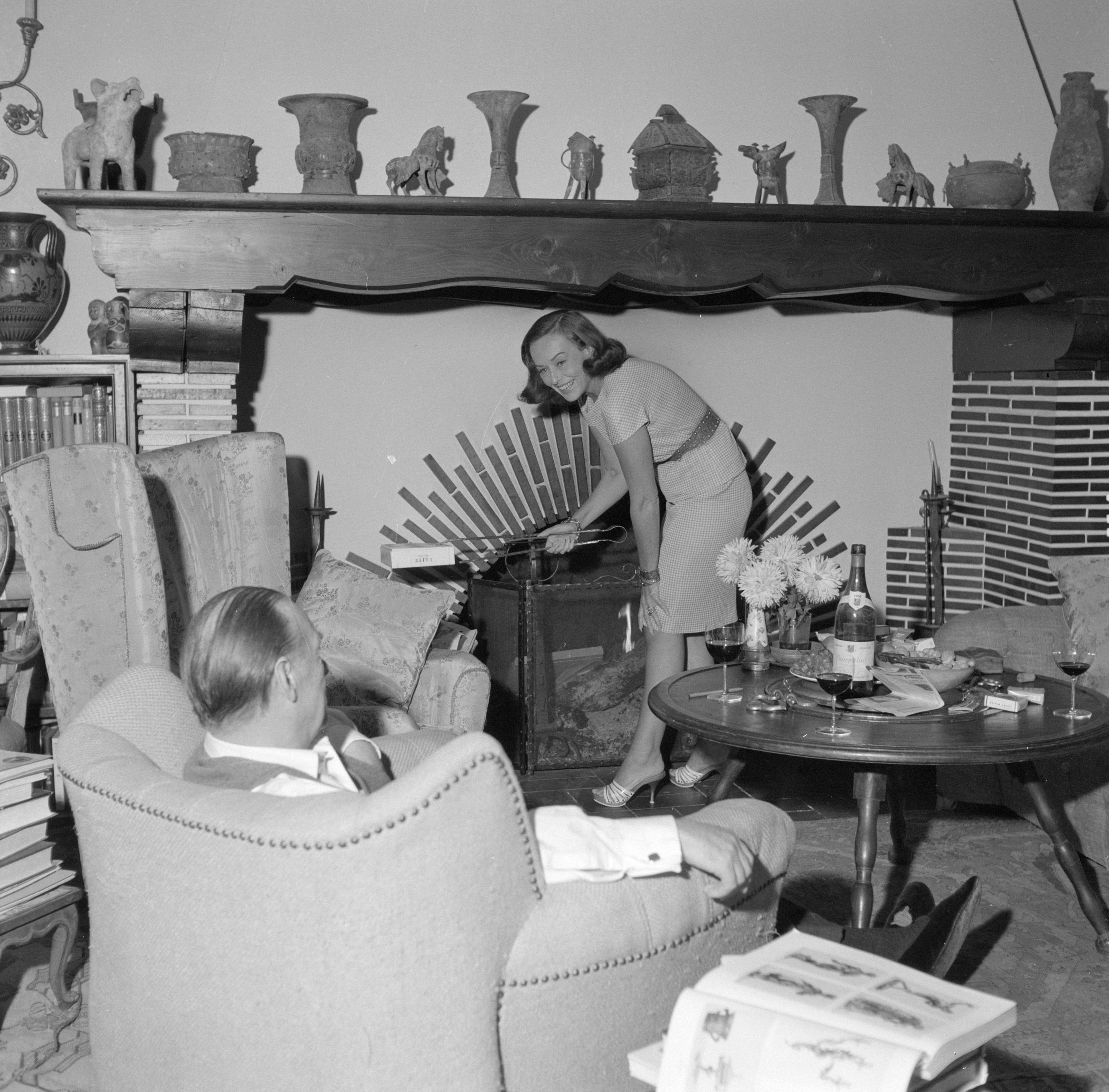
Remarque and Paulette Goddard in Ronco, Switzerland, 1961

Remarque's first marriage was to the actress Ilse Jutta Zambona in 1925. The marriage was stormy, and unfaithful on both sides. Remarque and Zambona divorced in 1930, but in 1933 they fled together to Switzerland. In 1938, they remarried, to prevent her from being forced to return to Germany, and in 1939 they immigrated to the United States, where they both became naturalized citizens in 1947. They divorced again on 20 May 1957, this time for good. Ilse Remarque died on 25 June 1975.

During the 1930s, Remarque had relationships with Austrian actress Hedy Lamarr, Mexican actress Dolores del Río, and German actress Marlene Dietrich. The affair with Dietrich began in September 1937, when they met on the Lido while in Venice for the film festival, and continued until at least 1940, maintained mostly by way of letters, telegrams and telephone calls. A selection of their letters was published in 2003 in the book Sag mir, daß du mich liebst ("Tell Me That You Love Me") and then in the 2011 play Puma.

Remarque married actress Paulette Goddard in 1958.

== Death and legacy ==
Remarque died of heart failure at the age of 72 in Locarno on 25 September 1970. His body was buried in the Ronco Cemetery in Ronco, Ticino, Switzerland. He never regained his German citizenship. Asked about this in an interview on his 69th birthday, Remarque replied that he refused to apply to be naturalized again as he had, after all, never applied to be denaturalized either.

Goddard, Remarque's wife, died in 1990, and her body was interred next to her husband's. She left a bequest of US$20 million to New York University to fund an institute for European studies, which is named in honour of Remarque, as well as funding "Goddard Hall" on the Greenwich Village campus in New York City.

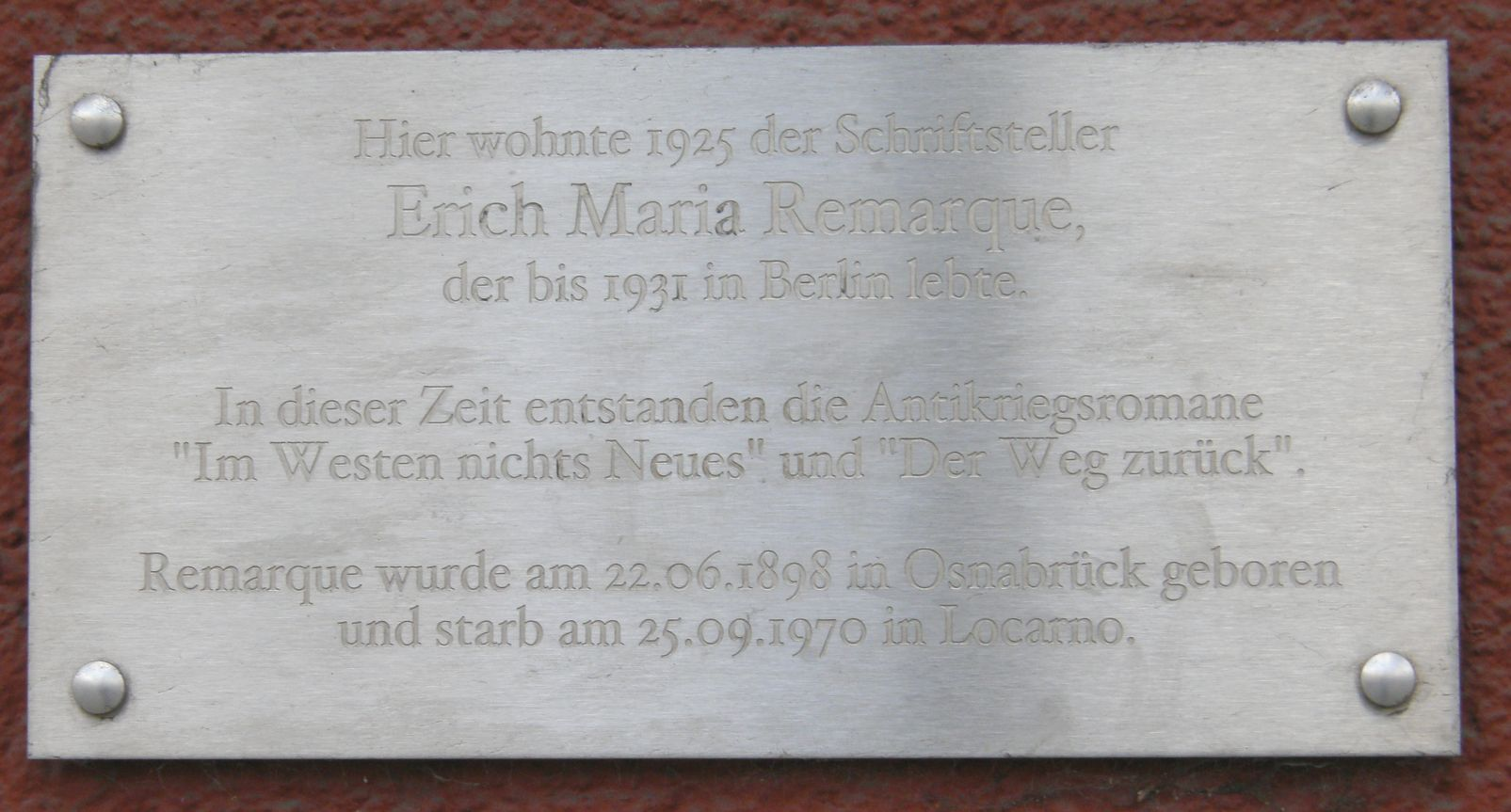
A commemorative plaque in memory of Erich Maria Remarque on Kaiserdamm Boulevard in Berlin

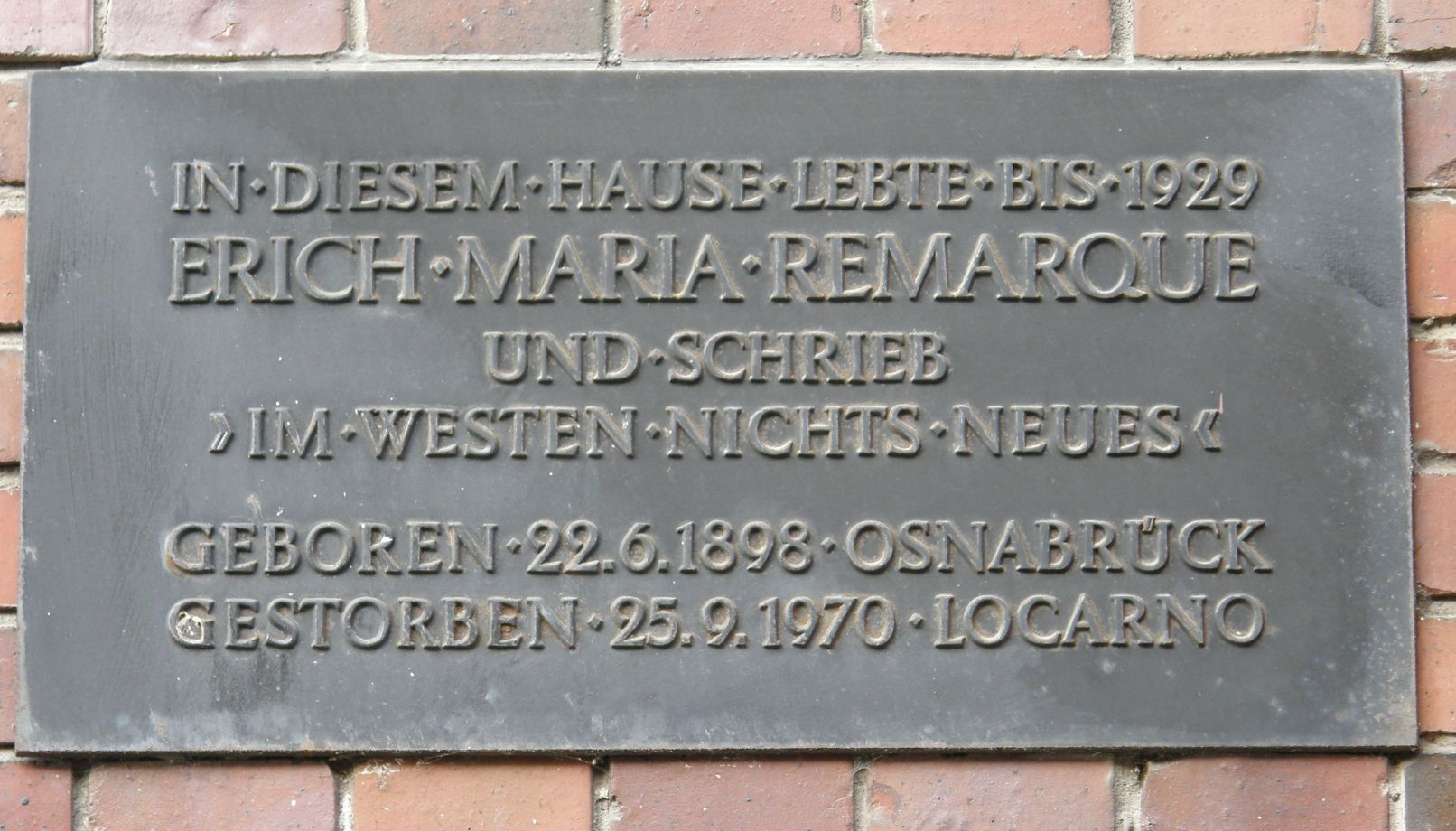
A commemorative plaque in memory of Erich Maria Remarque at the Wittelsbacherstrasse 5 in Berlin, unveiled on 22 June 1972

The first director of The Remarque Institute was Professor Tony Judt. Remarque's papers are housed at NYU's Fales Library.

After Erich Maria Remarque's death in 1970, his wife Paulette Goddard lived in the villa until her death in 1990. The villa was bequeathed to New York University as part of the estate of Paulette Goddard. Since New York University was not prepared to pay the associated inheritance tax of 18 million Swiss francs to the Canton of Ticino, the villa was confiscated by the canton.

The canton offered the villa at an auction around 2010, but there was initially no buyer, probably due to the high price and the high costs of modernizing the property. In November 2010, efforts to raise 6.2 million Swiss francs (US$7M), to buy and save the villa of Erich Maria Remarque and Paulette Goddard from demolition were underway. The intent was to transform the "Casa Monte Tabor" into a museum and home to an artist-in-residence program. In 2017, the property was being offered for sale as a private residence. However, by 2021, the property was finally purchased by a German couple who wish to preserve Casa Monte Tabor as a place to promote peace and preserve the legacy of Erich Maria Remarque. It will continue to be used for events on peace topics. The villa was extensively renovated in 2023.

The asteroid 10119 Remarque in the main asteroid belt, discovered in 1992 by Eric Walter Elst at the CERGA Observatory, was named in his honor.

== List of works ==
Note: the dates of English publications are those of the first publications in book form.

=== Novels ===
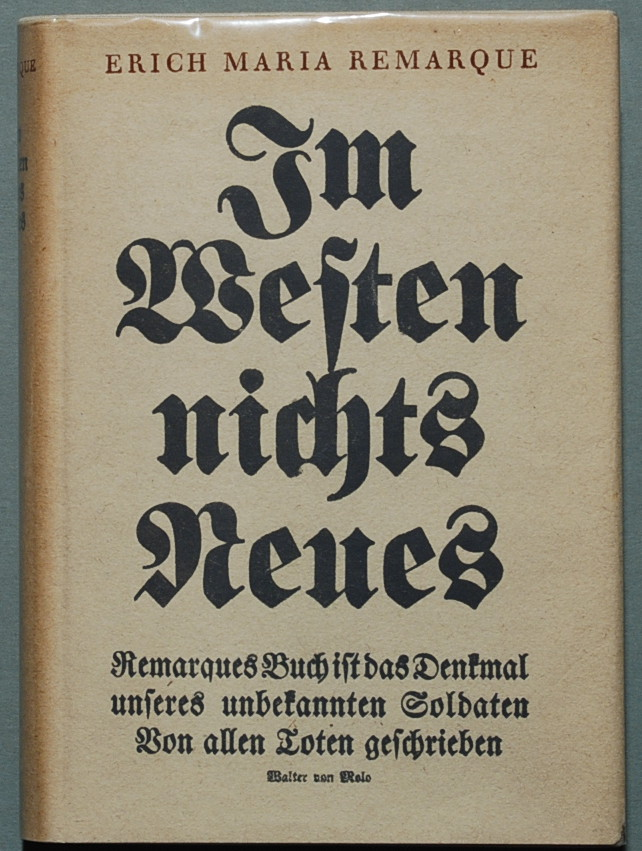
Im Westen nichts Neues, 1929 original version

- (1920) Die Traumbude. Ein Künstlerroman; English translation: The Dream Room
- (written 1924, published 1998) Gam
- (1928) Station am Horizont; English translation: Station at the Horizon
- (1929) Im Westen nichts Neues; English translation: All Quiet on the Western Front (1929)
- (1931) Der Weg zurück; English translation: The Road Back (1931)
- (1936) Drei Kameraden; English translation: Three Comrades (1937)
- (1939) Liebe deinen Nächsten; English translation: Flotsam (1941)
- (1945) Arc de Triomphe; English translation: Arch of Triumph (1945) (Reviewed by Dr. Albert Simard in Free World)
- (1952) Der Funke Leben; English translation: Spark of Life (1952)
- (1954) Zeit zu leben und Zeit zu sterben; English translation: A Time to Live and a Time to Die (1954)
- (1956) Der schwarze Obelisk; English translation: The Black Obelisk (1957)
- (1961) Der Himmel kennt keine Günstlinge (serialized as Geborgtes Leben); English translation: Heaven Has No Favorites (1961)
- (1962) Die Nacht von Lissabon; English translation: The Night in Lisbon (1964)
- (1970) Das gelobte Land; English translation: The Promised Land (2014)
- (1971) Schatten im Paradies; English translation: Shadows in Paradise (1972)

=== Other works ===
- (1931) Der Feind; English translation: The Enemy (1930–1931); short stories
- (1955) Der letzte Akt; English translation: The Last Act; screenplay
- (1956) Die letzte Station; English translation: Full Circle (1974); play
- (1962) The Longest Day; screenplay contribution; film
- (1988) Die Heimkehr des Enoch J. Jones; English translation: The Return of Enoch J. Jones; play
- (1994) Ein militanter Pazifist; English translation: A Militant Pacifist; interviews and essays

== See also ==
- Exilliteratur
