= Haste (Osnabrück district) =

District of Osnabrück, Lower Saxony, Germany

Coordinates: 52.3083°N 8.0486°E

Haste is a district in the north-east of Osnabrück, Germany. It is the fifth-largest district in the city on the River Hase, with a total land area of 788.8 hectares. Currently it has a population of about 6,600.

To the north-west it borders on the district of Pye, on Rulle to the north, Belm to the east, Dodesheide and Sonnenhügel to the south and on Hafen to the west. Two rivers run through this district – the Hase and the Nette.

== Transportation ==
The most important road in Haste is the Bundesstraße 68 (Federal Highway No. 68) which runs straight through it, constituting a key link between Osnabrück and the A1. Various city and regional bus lines operated by the Stadtwerke Osnabrück (local public utilities service) also pass through Haste. Until 1959 the district was also linked to the Osnabrück tram network on line 2, which ran from the terminus station “Haste” on Bramstraße to Schölerberg, stopping at Bramscher Straße, Hasetor, Nikolaiort and Neumarkt.

== Education, culture and churches ==
Haste is home to a number of noted institutions and buildings, such as the Angelaschule, the Thomas-Morus-Schule, the Kloster Nette (Nette Monastery), the Alte Mühle, the Nettebad swimming pool with sauna and Osnabrück University of Applied Sciences' school of Agricultural Sciences and Landscape Architecture.

A primary school, a comprehensive school, a vocational college and a grammar school are located in the district, along with a Protestant church (the Paul-Gerhardt-Kirche, built by renowned local architect Max H. Berling) and a Catholic church (the Christus-König-Kirche). There is also a voluntary fire service: the Freiwillige Feuerwehr Haste. Due to financial difficulties the district had to close its local library – the Stadtbibliothek Haste – in 2012.

Since 1981 the Stadtteiltreff Haste club – an initiative sponsored by the Katholischen Familien-Bildungsstätte e.V. (Catholic Family Education Group) – has been a key point of contact for children, youths and families. The Mehrgenerationenhaus (Multi-Generation House) for parents and senior citizens has been active since 2006.

== Sport ==
There are two sports clubs in Haste: the TuS Haste and the Spielvereinigung Haste.

== Notable people ==
The sculptor Fritz Szalinski was born in Haste in 1905.

== Cultural monuments ==
The Karlsteine – some of the region's best-known megalithic tombs from the Neolithic period – lie just to the north-west of Haste.

Furthermore, the Östringer Steine – like the Karlsteine also key artifacts of megalithic culture in Osnabrück – can be found just east of the district.

== Links ==
- Quarterly information from the Referat Stadtentwicklung und Bürgerbeteiligung (Department for Urban Development and Citizen Participation), Statistics Department, 4/2008 (PDF file, 1.49 MB, in German)
- City of Osnabrück, Referat für Stadtentwicklung und Bürgerbeteiligung – statistics -, 11/2009 (PDF file, 35.4 KB, in German)
- www.treffhaste.de
