= Ossensamstag =

Carnival procession in Osnabrück

Ossensamstag (derived from Ossenbrügge, Low German for Osnabrück) is the name used in Osnabrück, Germany to refer to the Saturday before Rosenmontag, on which carnival processions through the city have taken place since 1976. Every year the processions attract tens of thousands of spectators, watching the carnival floats pass along the route leading from the Johanniskirche via Neumarkt to the Rathaus. The traditional cry of "Osna Helau!" is derived from the city's name. Until 2014 NDR broadcast the procession live on television; since 2015 it has been available as a livestream broadcast.

== Course of events ==
The Ossensamstag procession starts on Johannisstraße in the former Neustadt area of Osnabrück. The carnival floats pass by the Stadtprinzenpaar (City Royal Couple) in front of the Johanniskirche. During the course of the procession sweets and toys have traditionally been thrown into the crowds gathered along the route. Alongside carnival associations from the city and surrounding district, floats are provided by various sport teams, other associations, individuals and also music and dance groups. The procession ends in front of the Rathaus, which is symbolically "stormed" by the revellers afterwards. The Lord Mayor then hands over the keys of the city to the city prince, who presents his "government agenda" for the next three days. After the procession celebrating participants will then head to the pubs in the Altstadt (old town centre).

== Controversy ==
Previously there had been many discussions regarding Ossensamstag. Critics focused heavily on the large number of highly inebriated (and occasionally underage) participants and the need for large-scale police deployments, litter and mess left after the end of the festival, excessive noise levels and reduced revenues for city centre shops. It was often suggested to move the Ossensamstag celebrations to the Sunday.

As a result of these criticisms the decision was taken in 2012 to start the procession at 2 p.m. instead of 11:11 a.m. Volume levels from the carnival floats were ordered to be reduced to 75 dB(A). In addition measures have been taken in recent years to prevent the consumption of alcohol prior to the festivities and intensify breathalyser testing of spectators during the procession. Furthermore, the organisations taking part in the procession are expected to contribute €10,000 collectively towards cleaning costs.
