= Darum-Gretesch-Lüstringen =

District of the city of Osnabrück, Lower Saxony, Germany

Coordinates: 52.2675°N 8.1306°E

Darum-Gretesch-Lüstringen is a district of the city of Osnabrück, Lower Saxony, Germany. It is situated in the east of the city and is made up of these three localities, as well as land from within the former boundaries of Schinkel. It is home to a Protestant and a Catholic church – respectively the Petruskirche (St. Peter’s Church) and the Marienkirche (St. Mary’s Church). There also used to be a railway station in this district – Osnabrück-Lüstringen, which was located on the Osnabrück–Hannover line and operated until 1978. The district is situated on the Route of Megalithic Culture.

== History ==
The area of this district has a long history of human occupation, reminders of which exist in the form of numerous megalithic tombs from the early Stone Age (such as the Gretescher Steine), the Teufelssteine (Devil’s Stones; these however belong to Voxtrup) and the Sundermannsteine (Sundermann Stones).

The old farmerships of Darum, Gretesch and Lüstringen – along with Icker, Vehrte, Powe and Haltern – originally belonged to the parish of Belm, which was founded in the 9th century. From the 11th century onwards the localities came together in a union combining their three names: Darum-Gretesch-Lüstringen. In later years they developed into separate municipalities in the district of Osnabrück, before being incorporated into the city as part of a wider-ranging reform of local government in Lower Saxony, which came into effect on 1 July 1972.

From the late 13th to the late 15th centuries there existed a “Gräftenburg” in the north-eastern area of the locality, whose artificially elevated, rectangular inner surface was completely surrounded by a several-sectioned moat (known as a Graft). An outer ward was positioned on the north side. Until the 14th century the castle remained in the possession of the noble family from which it took its name. It was sold to the Wüllneramt in Osnabrück in 1457. The collapse of the cloth industry in Osnabrück at the end of the 18th century pressured the Wüllneramt into selling the castle to the city in 1787. The entire site was levelled subsequently; today only a couple of corrugations around the area of the Schoeller paper mill give traces of its existence. A fortification was located to the south of the castle: the Gretescher Turm (Gretesch Tower), which also no longer exists today.

The local Felix Schoeller paper mill has played a particularly important role in the economic development of Gretesch, whose commercial tax payments (up until its incorporation into Osnabrück) helped make the district into one of the most affluent places in Germany. During this time the relatively small municipality had its own indoor swimming pool and sports stadium with tartan track; the latter is today home to the TSG Burg Gretesch sports team. At its opening in September 1970 the sprinter Gert Metz ran 100 metres in exactly 10.0 seconds – setting a new European record and also the best time that year.

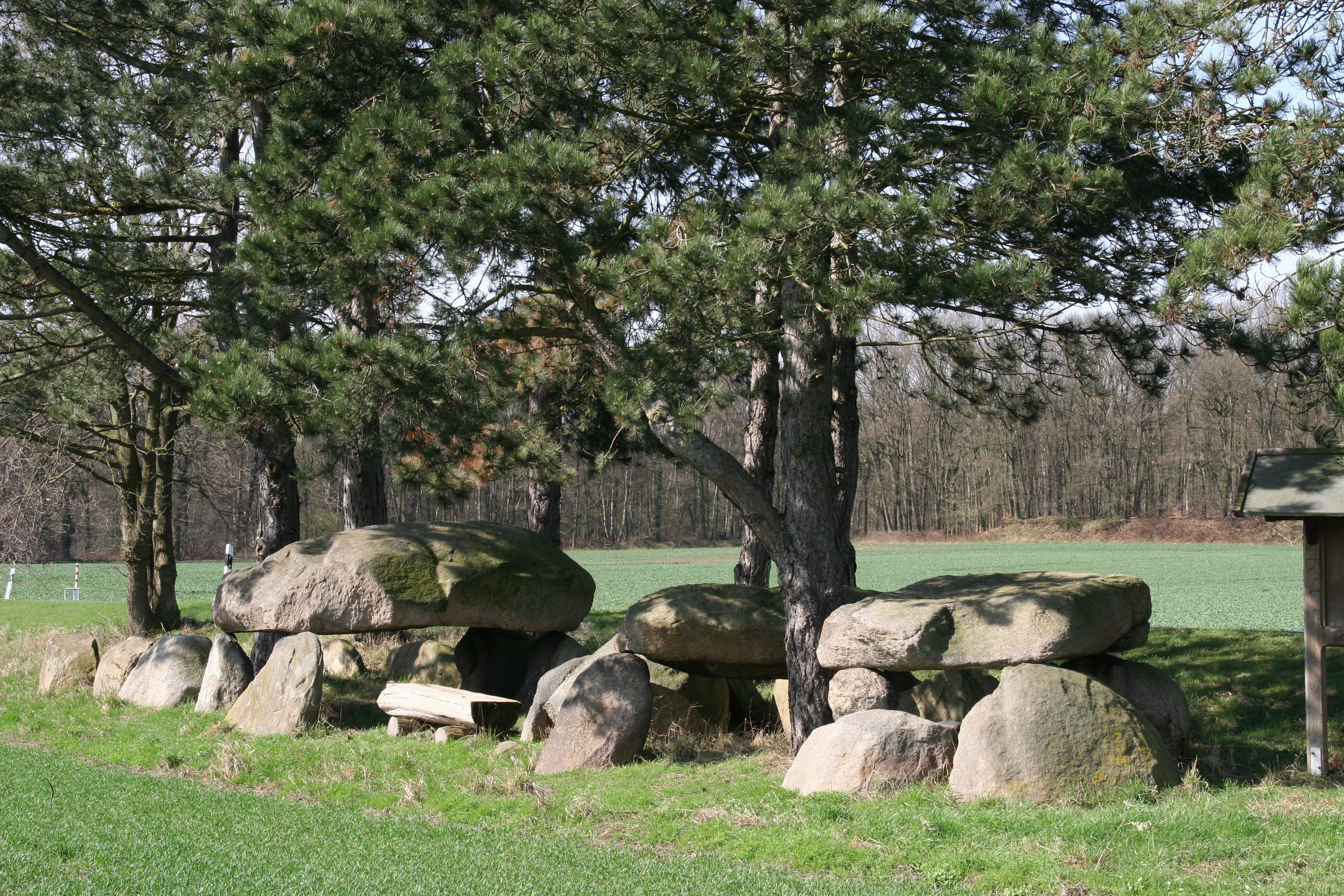
Megalithic tomb in
Gretesch:
Sundermannsteine

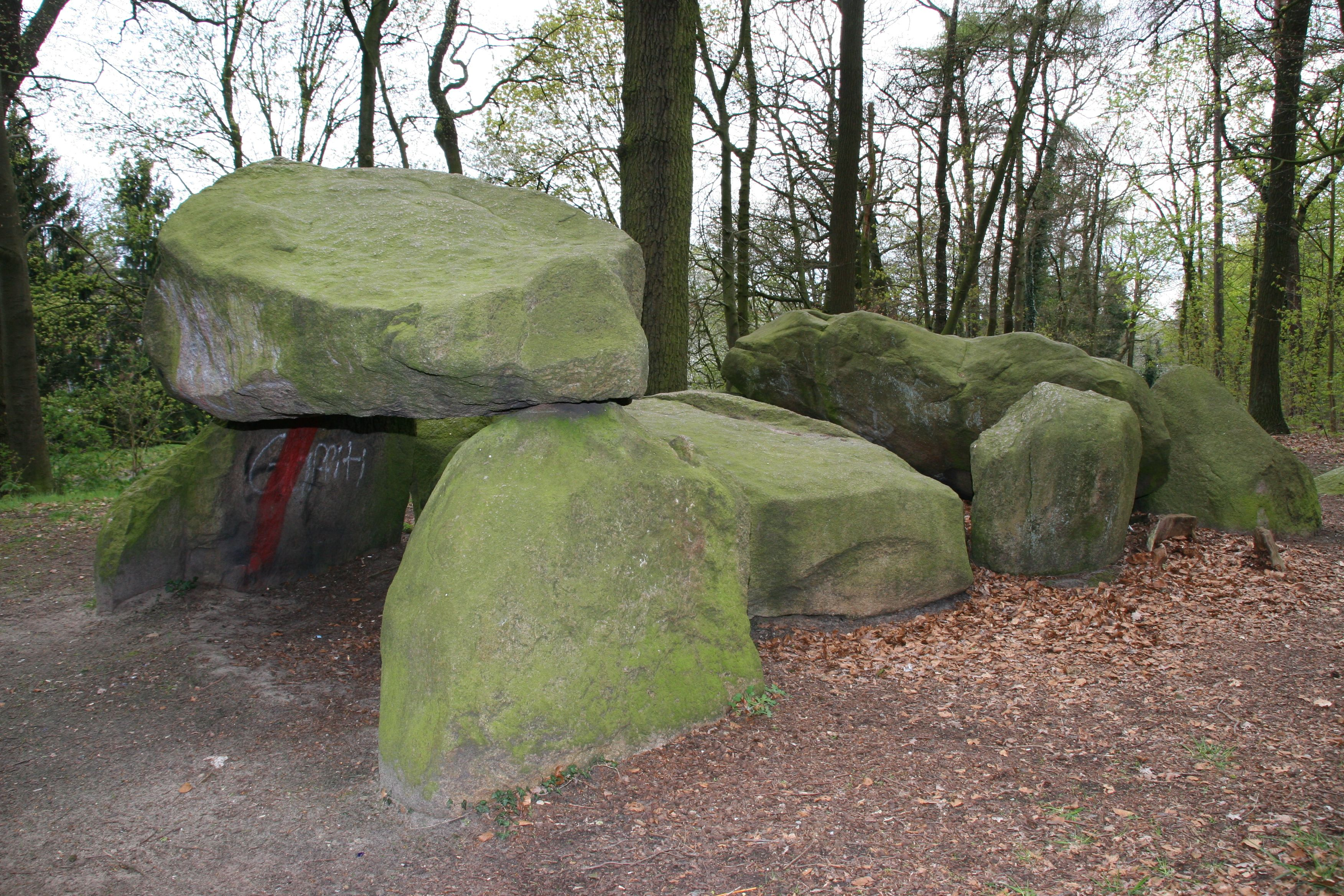
The Gretescher Steine,
part of the Route of Megalithic Culture

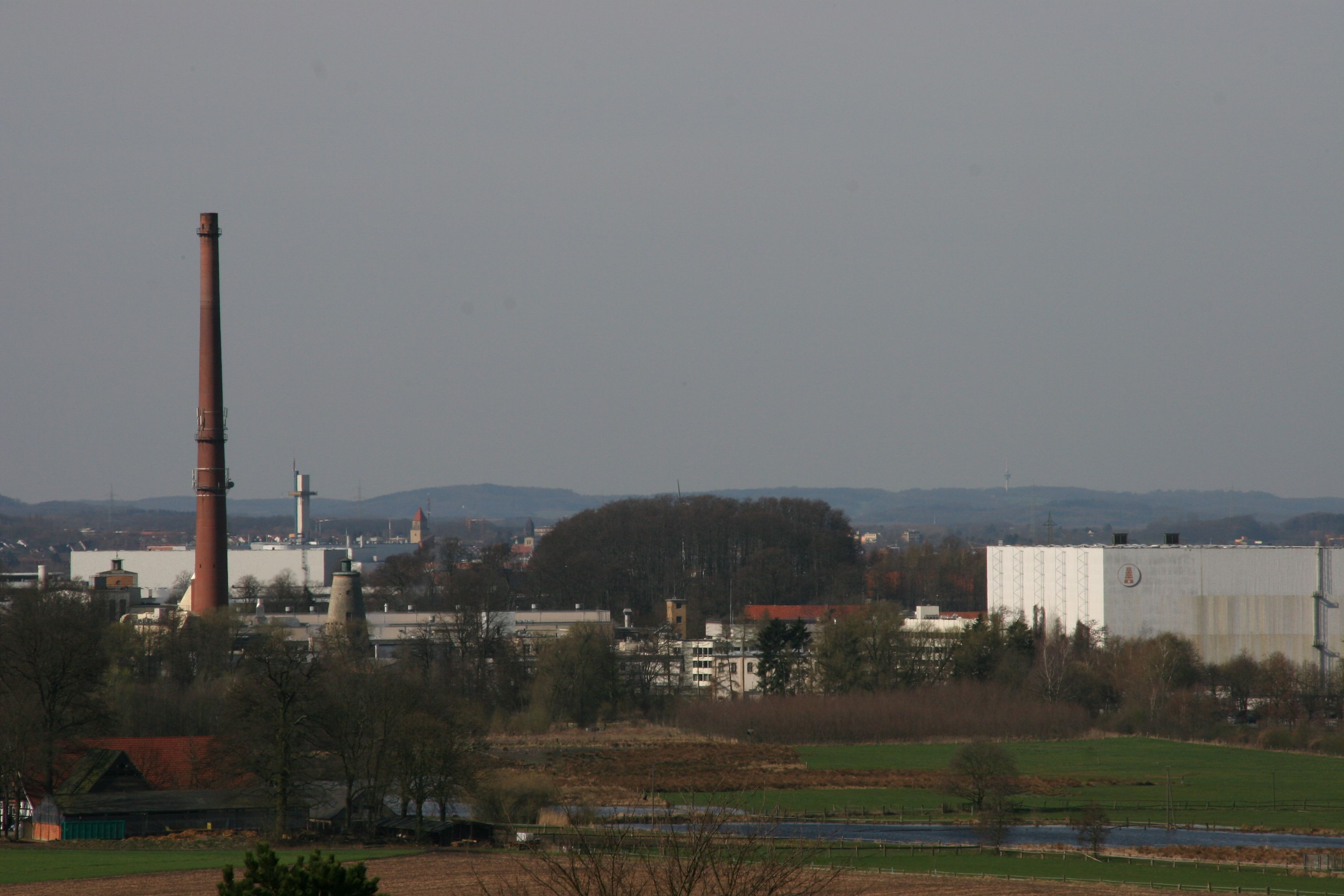
Felix Schoeller
paper mill

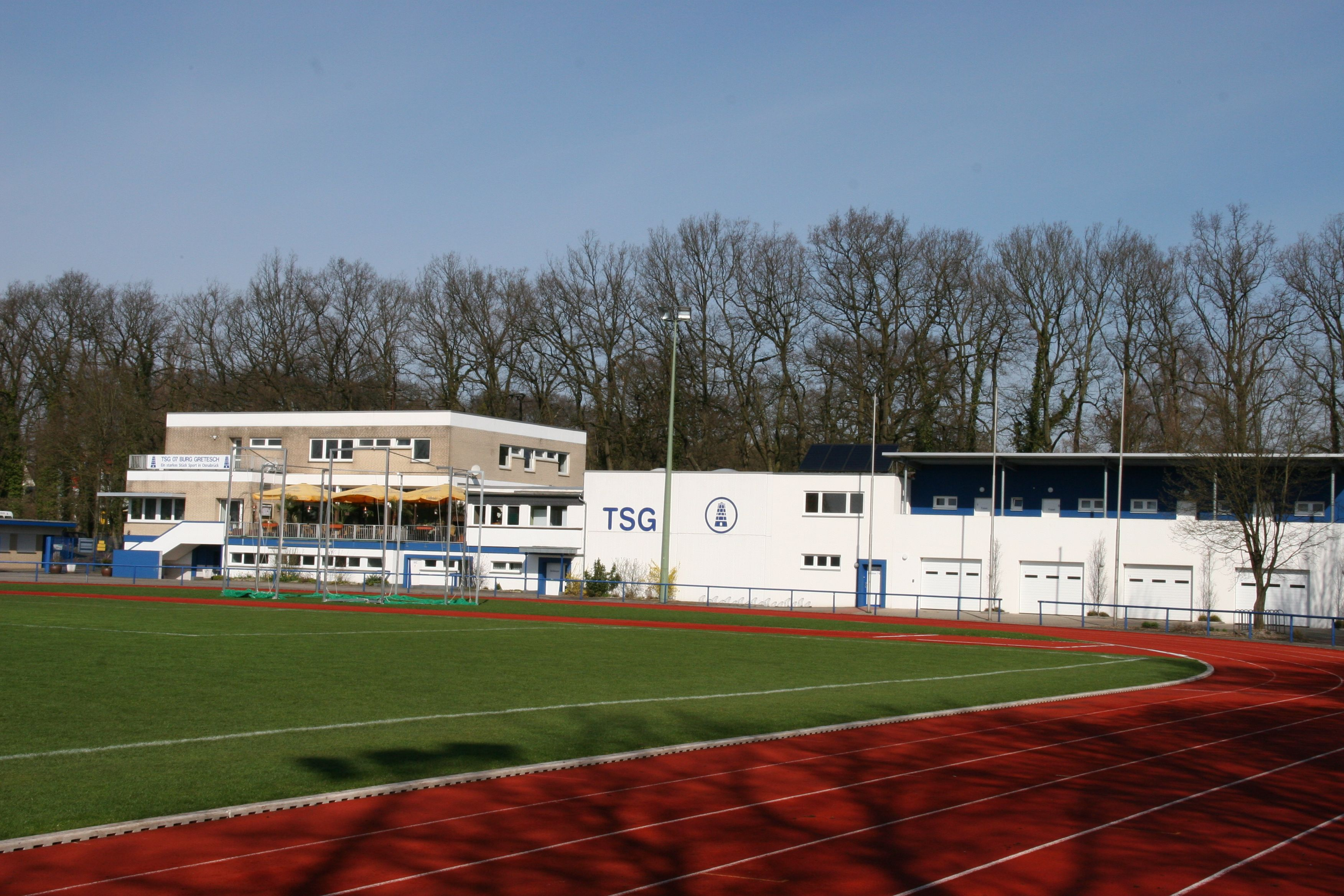
Gretesch sports stadium

== Literature ==
- Romano-Germanic Central Museum (Mainz) (Ed.): Führer zu vor- und frühgeschichtlichen Denkmälern – Das Osnabrücker Land III. Bd. 44 (Publisher: Philipp von Zabern) (Mainz, 1979)
