= Karl Fortlage =

German philosopher (1806–1881)

Karl Fortlage (German: [ˈfɔɐ̯tˌlaːɡə]; 12 June 1806 – 8 November 1881) was a German philosopher.

== Biography ==
Born in Osnabrück, Fortlage taught in Heidelberg and Berlin before becoming professor of philosophy at Jena in 1846 (1846 associate professor, 1860 honorary professor), a post he held until his death. Originally a follower of Hegel, he turned to Fichte and the psychologist Friedrich Eduard Beneke, agreeing with his assertion that psychology is the basis of all philosophy. The fundamental idea of his psychology is impulse, which combines representation (thereby presupposing consciousness) and feeling (i.e. pleasure). Reason is the highest thing in nature, i.e. it is divine in its nature. God is the absolute Ego, and the empirical egos are his instruments.

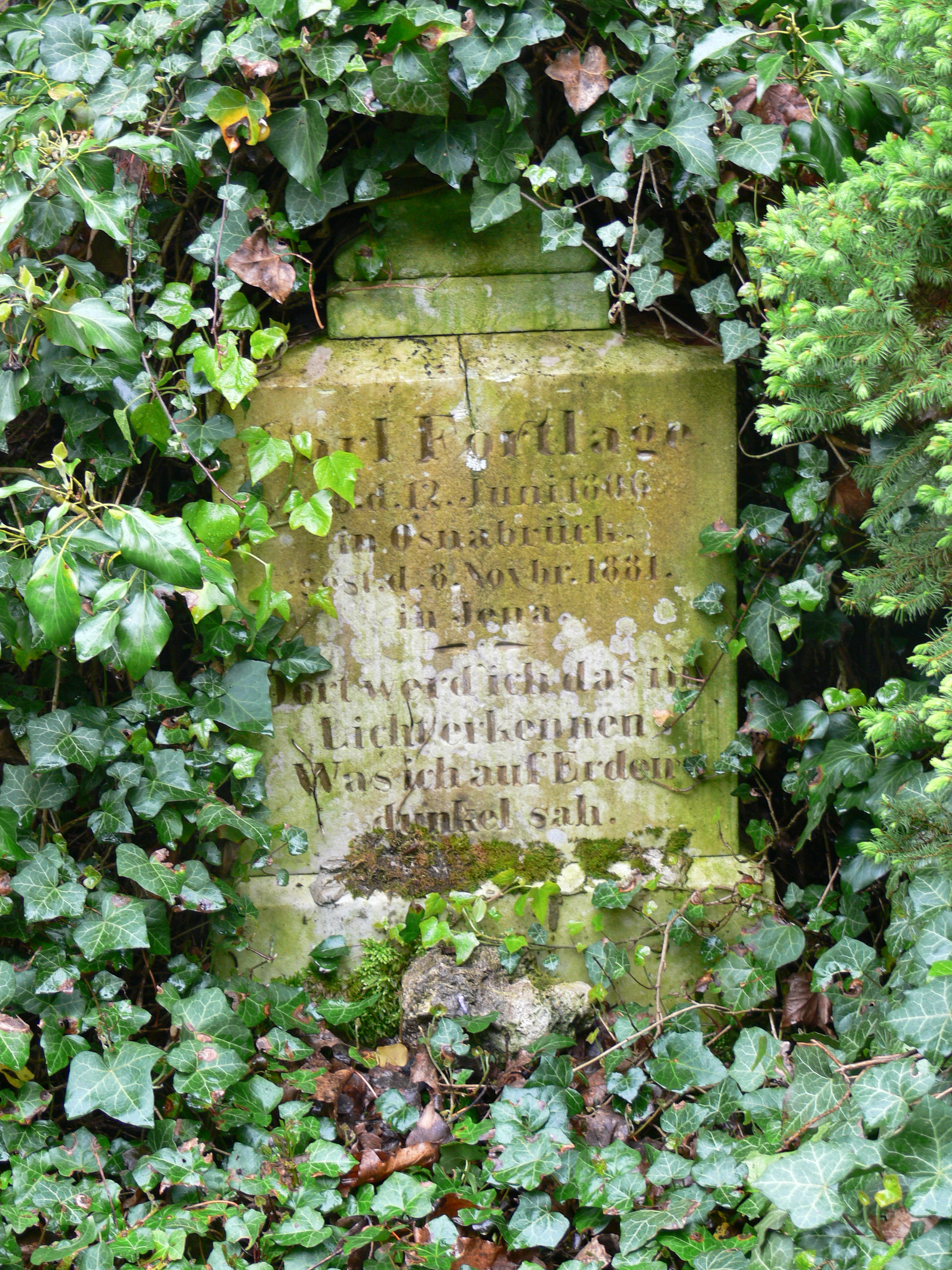
Gravesite of Fortlage at Johannisfriedhof in Jena

== Principal works ==
- Das musikalische System der Griechen in seiner Urgestalt : aus den Tonleitern des Alypius, 1847 – The musical system of the Greeks in its original form
- Genetische Geschichte der Philosophie seit Kant, 1852 – Genetic history of philosophy since Kant.
- System der psychologie : als empirischer wissenschaft aus der beobachtung des innern sinnes, 1855 – System of psychology; as an empirical science from the observation of the internal sense.
- Friedrich Rückert und seine Werke, 1867 – Friedrich Rückert and his work.
- Acht psychologische Vorträge, 1869 – Eight psychological lectures.
- Beiträge zur Psychologie als Wissenschaft aus Speculation und Erfahrung, 1875 – Contributions to psychology as a science of speculation and experience.
