= Osnabrück =

City in Lower Saxony, Germany

Osnabrück Ossenbrügge (Westphalian)
- City
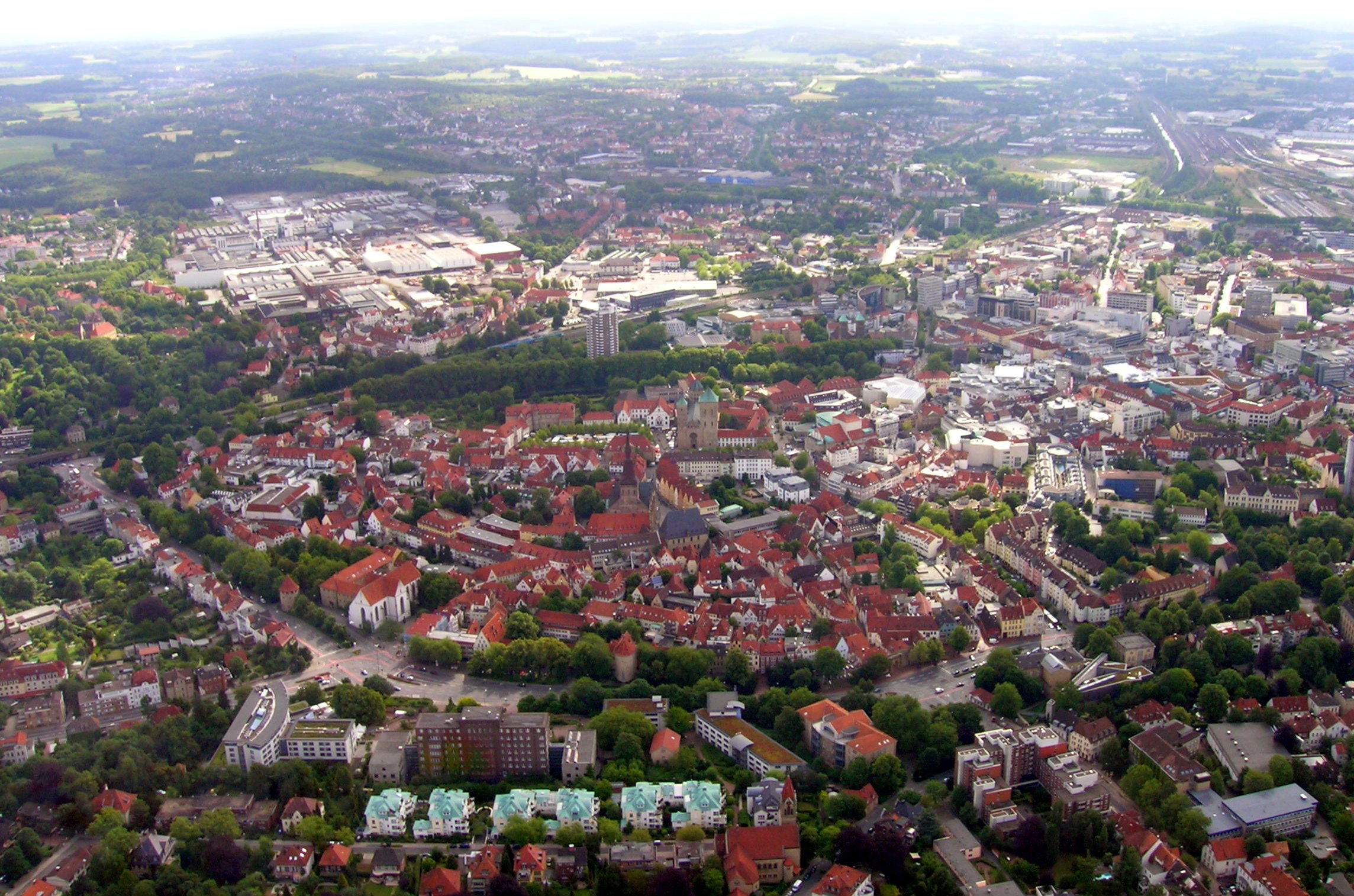
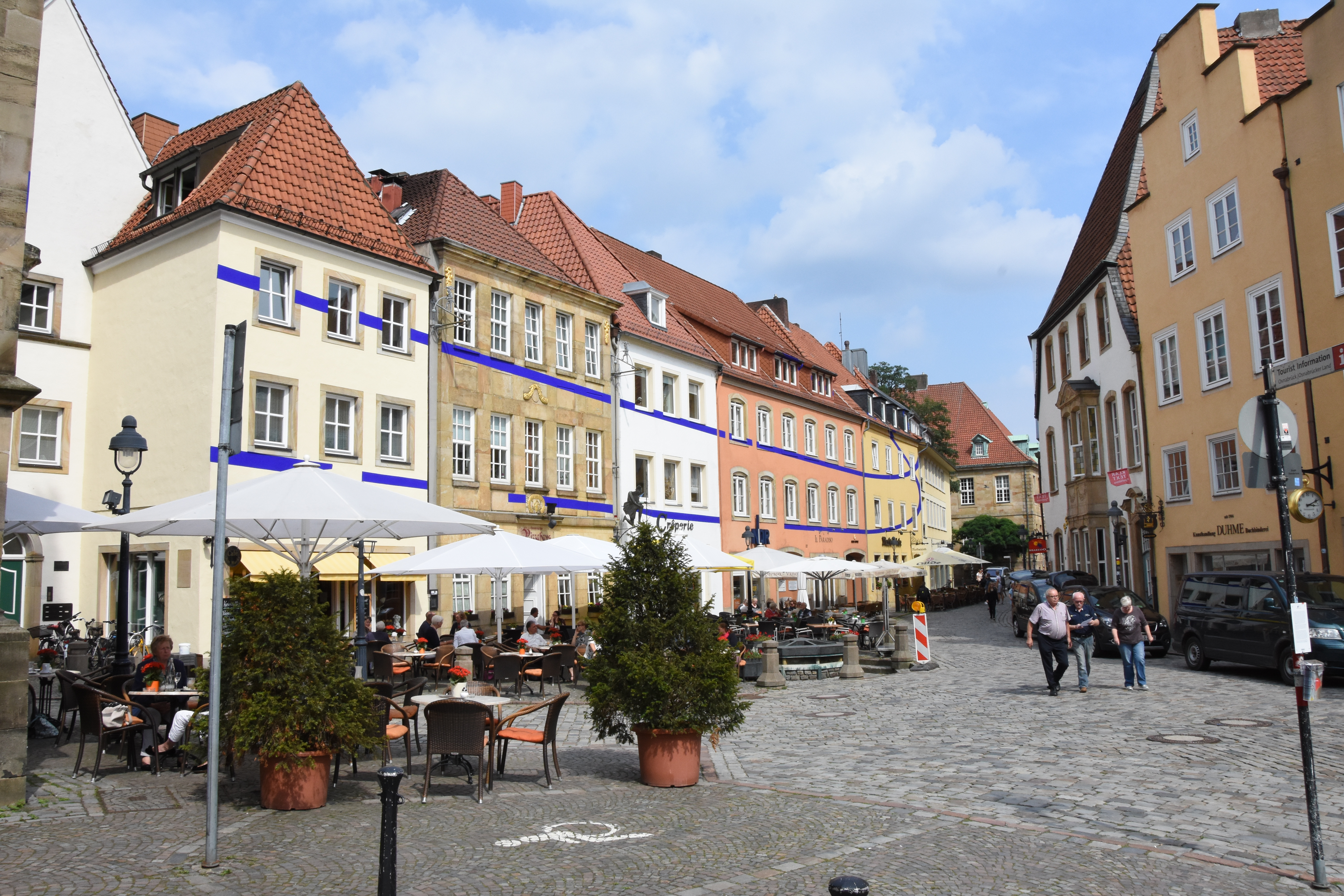
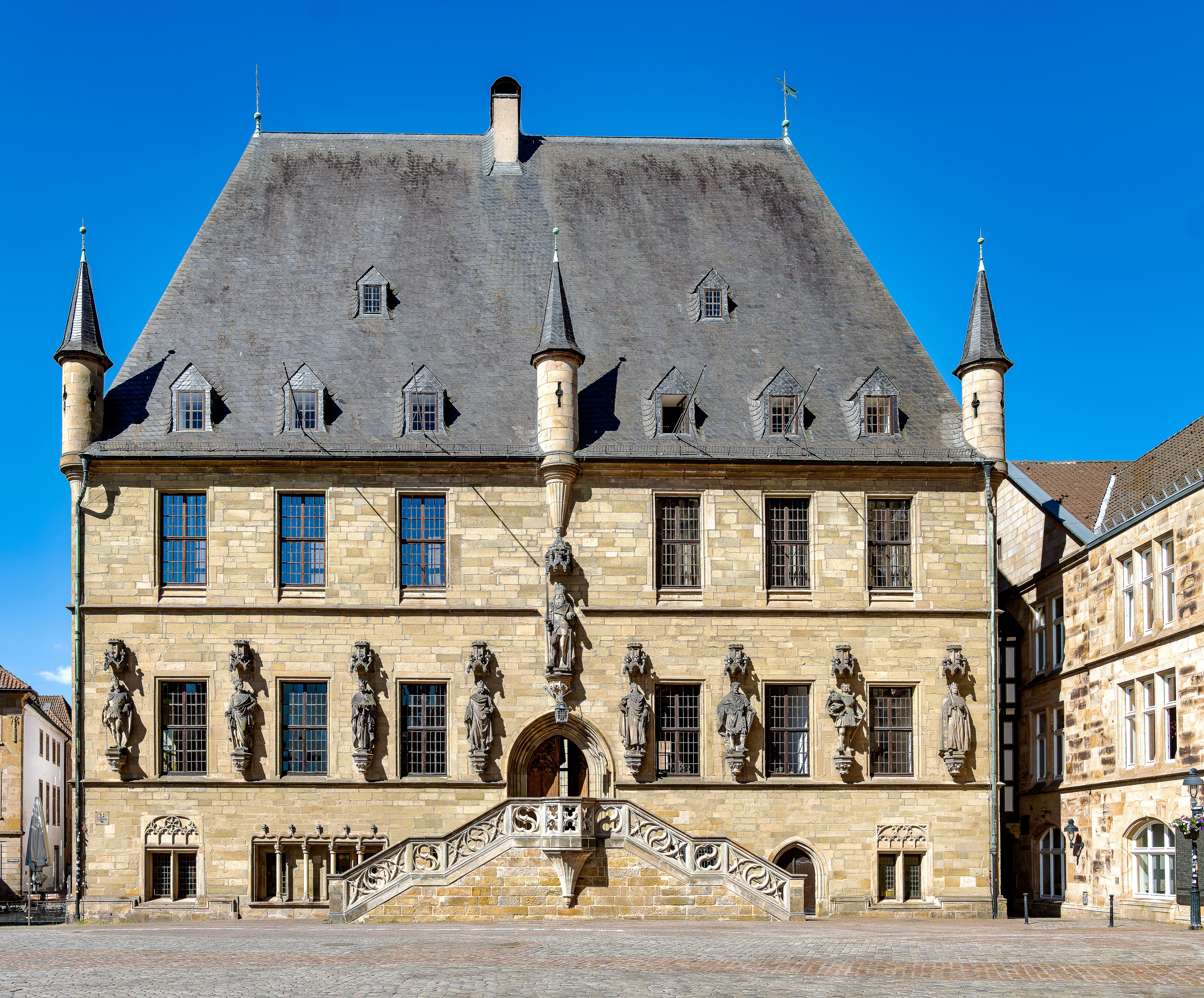
- Aerial view City centre Old town hall

- Flag Coat of arms
- Interactive map of Osnabrück
- Location within Germany Location within Lower Saxony
- Coordinates: 52°17′N 8°3′E
- Country: Germany
- State: Lower Saxony
- District: Kreisfreie Stadt

Government
  - Mayor (2021–34): Katharina Pötter (CDU)

Area
  - City: 119.80 km^{2} (46.26 sq mi)
- Elevation: 63 m (207 ft)

Population (2025-12-31)
  - City: 166,257
  - Density: 1,387.8/km^{2} (3,594.4/sq mi)
  - Metro: 272,674
- Time zone: UTC+01:00 (CET)
  - Summer (DST): UTC+02:00 (CEST)
- Postal codes: 49074–49090
- Dialling codes: 0541
- Vehicle registration: OS
- Website: www.osnabrueck.de

Osnabrück (German: [ɔsnaˈbʁʏk]; Westphalian: Ossenbrügge; archaic English: Osnaburg) is a city in Lower Saxony in western Germany. It is situated on the river Hase in a valley penned between the Wiehen Hills and the northern tip of the Teutoburg Forest. With a population of 166,057 Osnabrück is the fourth largest city in Lower Saxony.

More recently Osnabrück has become well known for its industry. Numerous companies in the automobile, paper, steel and grocery sectors are located in the city and its surrounding area. In spite of the massive destruction inflicted on the city during World War II, the Altstadt ('old town') was eventually reconstructed extensively with designs accurately depicting the original medieval architecture there. Osnabrück was also the home of the largest British garrison outside the United Kingdom. Osnabrück's modern, urban image is enhanced by the presence of more than 22,000 students studying at the University and the University of Applied Sciences. Although part of the state of Lower Saxony, historically, culturally and linguistically Osnabrück is considered part of the region of Westphalia.

== Name ==
The origin of the name Osnabrück is disputed. The suffix -brück suggests a bridge over or to something (from Brücke, 'bridge') but the prefix Osna- is explained in at least two different ways: the traditional explanation is that today's name is a corruption of Ossenbrügge (Westphalian meaning 'oxen bridge'), which is etymologically and historically impossible, because the town is older than this corruption of consonants (documented in 13th century, Osnabrück was founded in 8th century), but others state that it is derived from the name of the Hase river which is arguably derived from Asen (Æsir), thus giving Osnabrück the meaning 'bridge to the gods', and previously Tacitus named people living near the grey river (Hase) Chasuarii. It may also be noted that Osnabrück is situated on the northern end of the Teutoburg Forest, which until the 19th century was known as the Osning. The city gave its name to the textile fabric of osnaburg.

== History ==
Historical population
Year	Pop.	±%
780	800	—
1171	3,500	+337.5%
1500	6,000	+71.4%
1646	5,500	−8.3%
1800	8,564	+55.7%
1871	23,308	+172.2%
1900	51,573	+121.3%
1910	65,957	+27.9%
1919	85,017	+28.9%
1925	88,911	+4.6%
1933	94,277	+6.0%
1939	99,070	+5.1%
1946	88,663	−10.5%
1950	109,538	+23.5%
1961	138,658	+26.6%
1970	143,905	+3.8%
1987	150,807	+4.8%
2011	154,513	+2.5%
2018	164,748	+6.6%
Population size may be affected by changes in administrative divisions. Source: Development of Osnabrück population

Population development since 780

=== Medieval ===
Osnabrück initially developed as a marketplace next to the bishopric founded by Charlemagne, King of the Franks, in 780. Some time prior to 803, the city became the seat of the Prince-Bishopric of Osnabrück. Although the precise date is uncertain, it is likely that Osnabrück is the oldest bishopric in Lower Saxony.

In the year 804 Charlemagne was said to have founded the Gymnasium Carolinum in Osnabrück. This would make it the oldest German Gymnasium school, but the charter date is disputed by historians, some of whom believe it could be a forgery.

In 889 the town was given merchant, customs, and coinage privileges by King Arnulf of Carinthia. Osnabrück was first referred to in records as a "city" in 1147. A decade later, Emperor Frederick Barbarossa granted the city fortification privileges (Befestigungsrecht). Most of the towers which were part of the original fortifications are still visible in the city. Osnabrück became a member of the Hanseatic League in the 12th century, as well as a member of the Westphalian Federation of Cities.

The history of the town in the later Middle Ages was recorded in a chronicle by Albert Suho, one of Osnabrück's most important clerics in the 15th century.

=== Early Modern age ===
From 1561 to 1639 there was a considerable amount of social unrest and tension in Osnabrück due to the Protestant Reformation, the Thirty Years' War and also witch-hunting. In 1582, during the rule of Mayor Hammacher (1565–1588), 163 women were executed as alleged witches; most of them were burned alive. In total, 276 women were executed, along with 2 men who had been charged with wizardry.

The first Lutheran services were held in Osnabrück in 1543. Over the next century, Lutheranism expanded in the city and several Protestant bishops were elected. However, the Catholic churches continued to operate, and the city never became completely Lutheran. After the Thirty Years' War broke out, a Catholic bishop was elected in 1623, and the city was occupied by troops of the Catholic League in 1628. The Gymnasium Carolinum was upgraded to a Jesuit university in 1632, but the university was closed a year later when the city was taken by Swedish troops and restored to Protestant control.

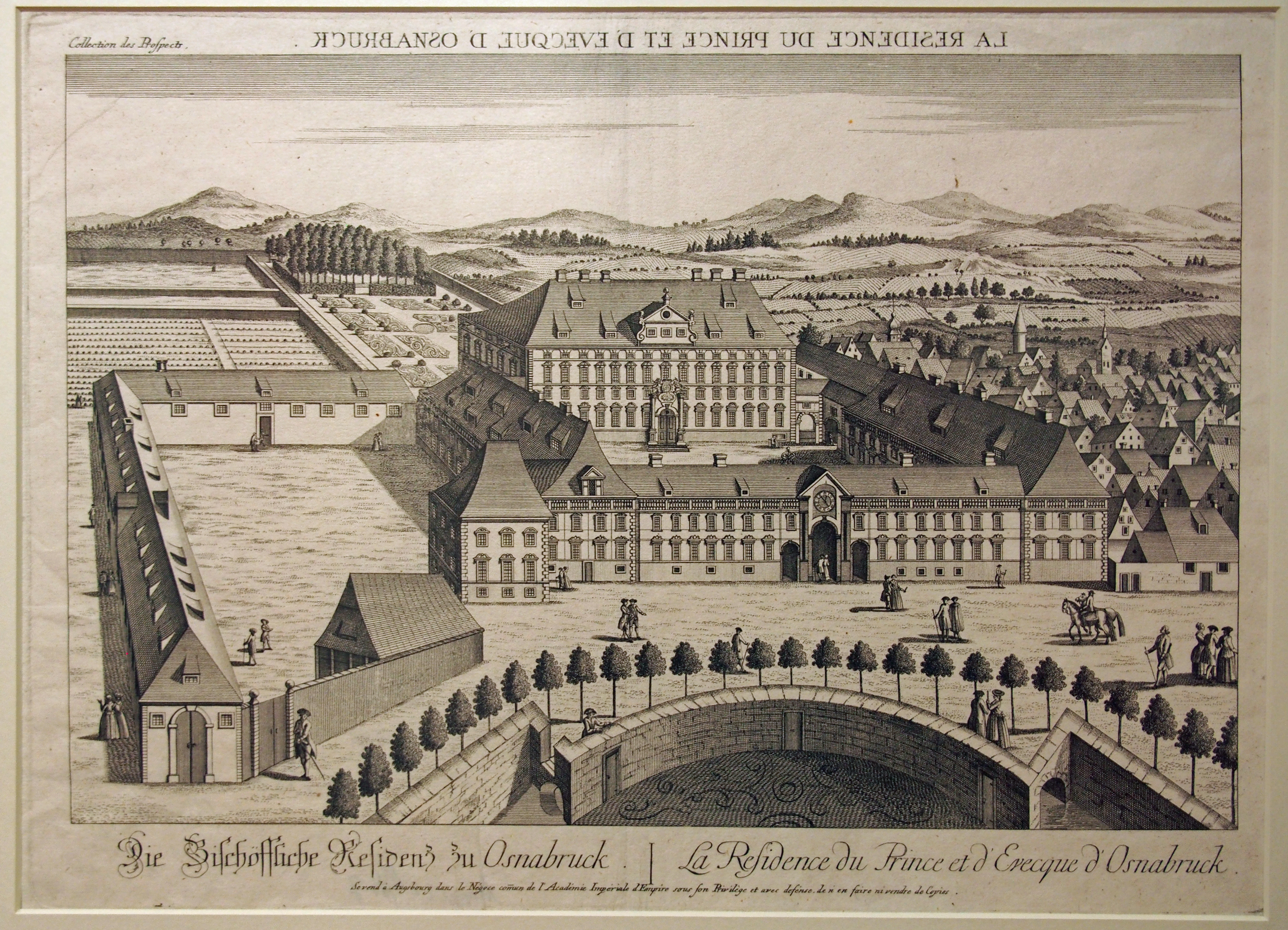
The Prince-Bishop's Palace, 1777

Peace negotiations took place in Osnabrück and the nearby city of Münster from 1643 to 1648. The twin Treaties of Osnabrück and Münster, collectively known as the Peace of Westphalia, ended the Thirty Years' War. Osnabrück was officially recognized as bi-confessional Catholic and Lutheran. The prince-bishopric would be held alternately by a Catholic bishop and a Lutheran bishop. The Protestant bishop would be selected from the descendants of the Dukes of Brunswick-Lüneburg, with priority given to the cadets of what became the House of Hanover. From 1667, prince-bishop Ernest Augustus, Duke of Brunswick-Lüneburg, built the new baroque palace. His son, George I of Great Britain, died in the palace, at the time residence of his younger brother, prince-bishop Ernest Augustus, Duke of York and Albany, on a travel on 11 June 1727.

In the early 18th century, renowned local jurist and social theorist Justus Möser wrote a highly influential constitutional history of the town, the Osnabrücker Geschichte. Following the Seven Years' War, the town's population fell below 6,000, however an economic revival linked to the linen and tobacco industries caused it to rise again from the 1780s onwards.

=== 19th century ===
The French Revolutionary Wars brought Prussian troops into the city in 1795, followed by the French in 1803. As a result, the town's population was kept below 10,000 for the whole first decade of the 19th century. The Napoleonic period saw possession of the city change hands several times. Control of Osnabrück passed to the Electorate of Hanover in 1803 during the German Mediatisation, and then briefly to the Kingdom of Prussia in 1806. From 1807 to 1810 the city was part of the Kingdom of Westphalia, after which it passed to the First French Empire. After 1815, it became part of the Kingdom of Hanover.

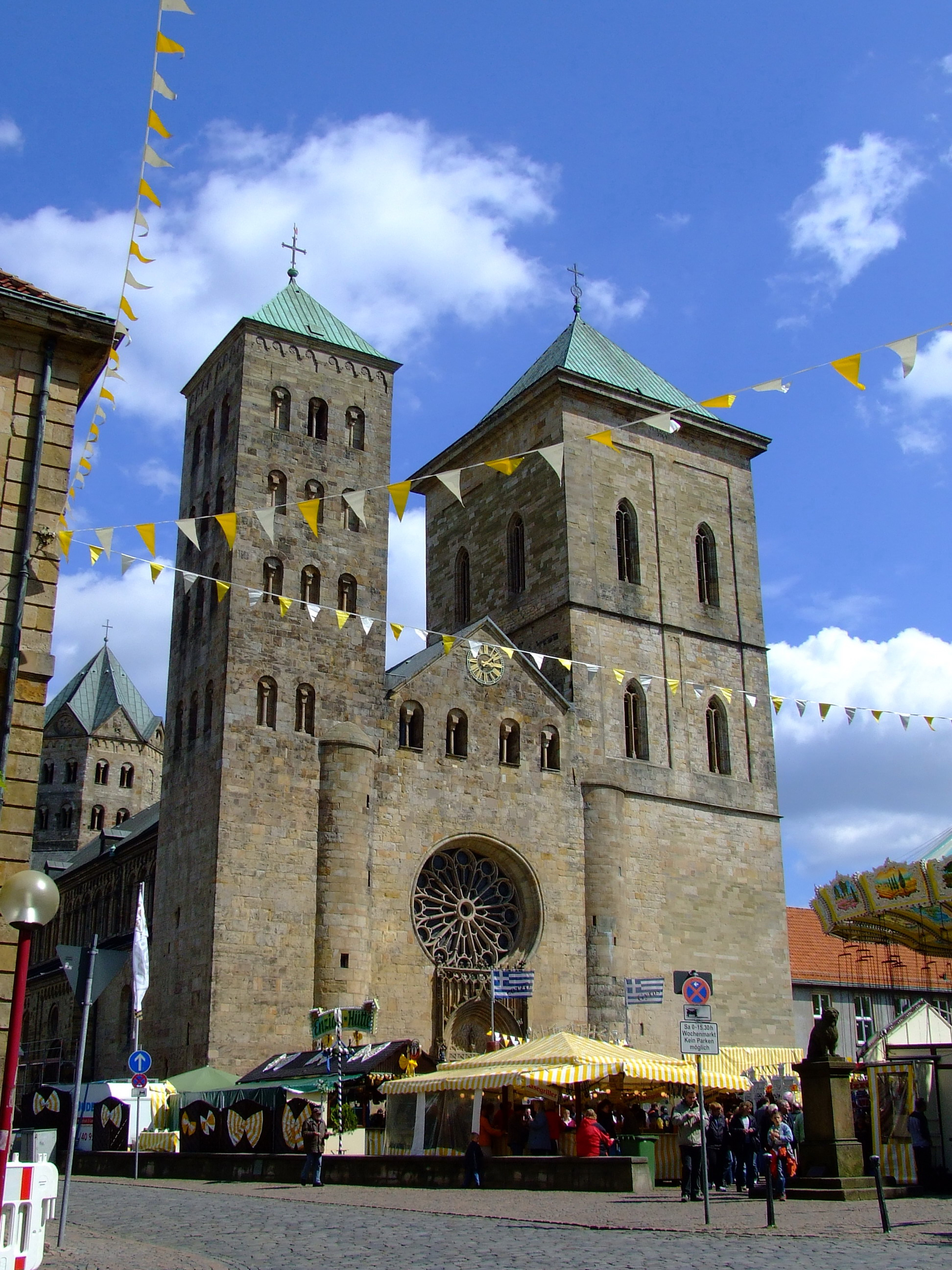
St. Peter's Cathedral

The town's first railway line was built in 1855, connecting it with Löhne. Further rail connections appeared over the following decades, connecting Osnabrück with Emden from 1856, Cologne from 1871 and Hamburg from 1874. In 1866, Osnabrück was annexed by Prussia after the Austro-Prussian War and administered as part of the Province of Hanover. Growth of the local economy and population was fuelled by expansion in the engineering and textile industries, with the Hammersen Weaving Mill established in 1869 and the Osnabrücker Kupfer- und Drahtwerk metallurgical firm following in 1873. The later 19th century also saw growth in the number of schools and the arrival of electricity and modern sanitation.

=== 20th century ===
By 1914, Osnabrück had over 70,000 inhabitants. The outbreak of the First World War necessitated food rationing; the Allied blockade and a harsh winter in 1917 led to further shortages. Following Germany's defeat in 1918, a council made up of workers and soldiers took control during the November Revolution, but were replaced by the new Weimar Republic the following year. Similarly to many other German cities, Osnabrück experienced considerable inflation and unemployment in the 1920s, with over 2,000 out of work by 1923 and nearly 14,000 receiving some form of government assistance by 1928.

Politically, Osnabrück in the 1920s was a stronghold of support for the Social Democrats and the Catholic Centre Party. However, in the Reichstag elections of September 1930, the Nazi Party received the greatest percentage of votes in the city (nearly 28%) – a more than seven-fold increase from their electoral performance in Osnabrück two years prior. During the campaigns prior to the two federal elections in 1932, both Adolf Hitler and Joseph Goebbels made well-attended speeches in the city.

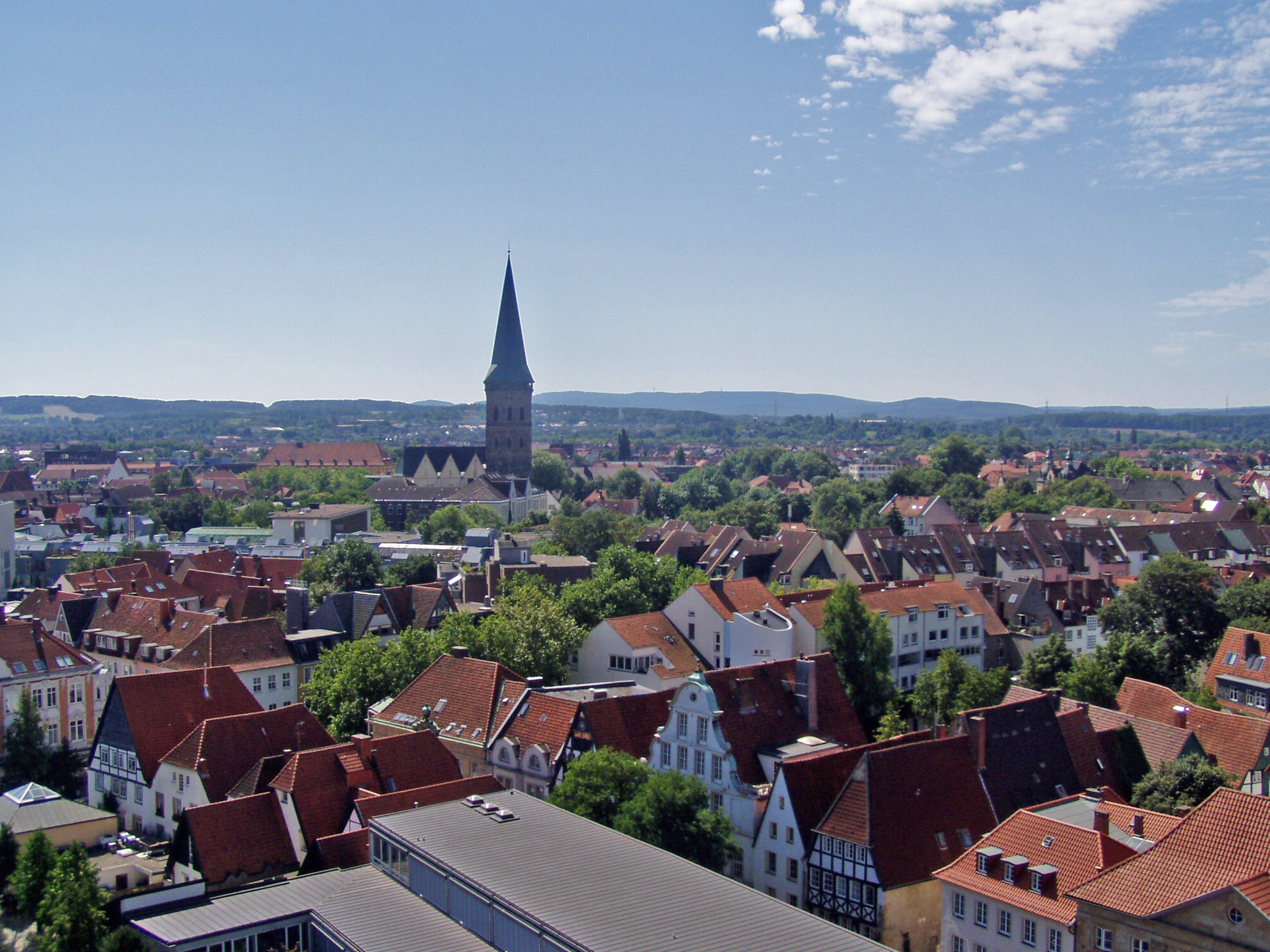
Southern part of the inner city

Following the Nazis' seizure of power in January 1933, Osnabrück was subjected to the implementation of National Socialist economic, political, and social programmes. These resulted in economic growth for ethnic Germans who did not run afoul of the new regime, and the town went from having over 10,000 unemployed in early 1933 to actually having a labour shortage five years later. However, dissenters, supporters of opposition parties and German Jews (who had experienced centuries of discrimination in the city) did not share in this growth and found themselves discriminated against, imprisoned or forced to close their businesses and leave town. During World War II, both Jews and Romani people were deported to concentration camps and extermination camps en masse. In October 1942, a subcamp of the 2nd SS construction brigade (forced labour camp) in Bremen was established in Osnabrück. Eighty six of the 250 prisoners died of starvation and maltreatment before the subcamp's dissolution in May 1943. Osnabrück was also the location of the Oflag VI-C and Oflag 66 prisoner-of-war camps for Serbian, French and Belgian officers.

The war ended for Osnabrück on 4 April 1945, when the XVII Corps of Field Marshal Bernard Montgomery's Second Army entered the city with little resistance. By this time, the city had been extensively bombed and required major reconstructive programmes following the war's end. Leading Nazis fled the city and the British appointed a new mayor, Johannes Petermann. However, during the allied occupation of Germany a British military governor, Colonel Geoffrey Day was placed in charge of administering the city. Relations between the occupiers and the citizens of Osnabrück were generally peaceful, though tensions existed; some minor fights broke out between British soldiers and local youths and some Osnabrückers resented the relationships that developed between the occupiers and local women. Additionally, the British took over more than seventy homes for their own use by the middle of 1946. Amidst shortages, the black market thrived and became one of the main focuses of police activity.

After World War II West Germany realigned its states; Osnabrück became part of the new state of Lower Saxony in 1946. The British continued to maintain Osnabrück Garrison, a garrison near the city, which at one point was the largest British garrison in the world, housing some 4,000 troops and employing around 500 local civilians. It was the target of a PIRA attack in 1996. Due to budget cuts, the troops were withdrawn in 2008 and the property returned to the local government.

After three centuries, the city finally obtained its university when the government of Lower Saxony established the University of Osnabrück in 1974.

Largest foreign resident groups in Osnabrück as of 31 December 2017:

Rank	Nationality	Population (31 December 2017)
1	Syria	2,725
2	Turkey	2,705
3	Bulgaria	2,025
4	Poland	1,580
5	Portugal	1,030

== Climate ==
The climate is Cfb (near Dfb) with warm, rainy summers and chilly to cold, dark winters.

Climate data for Osnabrück (1991–2020 normals)
Month	Jan	Feb	Mar	Apr	May	Jun	Jul	Aug	Sep	Oct	Nov	Dec	Year
Mean daily maximum °C (°F)	4.5 (40.1)	5.6 (42.1)	9.4 (48.9)	14.4 (57.9)	18.3 (64.9)	21.2 (70.2)	23.7 (74.7)	23.3 (73.9)	18.8 (65.8)	13.8 (56.8)	8.3 (46.9)	4.8 (40.6)	13.8 (56.8)
Daily mean °C (°F)	1.0 (33.8)	1.2 (34.2)	4.9 (40.8)	9.3 (48.7)	13.2 (55.8)	16.5 (61.7)	18.8 (65.8)	18.8 (65.8)	14.6 (58.3)	10.0 (50.0)	5.5 (41.9)	1.8 (35.2)	9.9 (49.8)
Mean daily minimum °C (°F)	−0.3 (31.5)	0.0 (32.0)	2.2 (36.0)	4.8 (40.6)	8.3 (46.9)	11.1 (52.0)	13.6 (56.5)	13.3 (55.9)	10.2 (50.4)	6.7 (44.1)	3.4 (38.1)	0.4 (32.7)	6.2 (43.2)
Average precipitation mm (inches)	83.3 (3.28)	62.7 (2.47)	66.6 (2.62)	46.7 (1.84)	62.8 (2.47)	64.7 (2.55)	85.3 (3.36)	88.7 (3.49)	73.2 (2.88)	70.2 (2.76)	78.2 (3.08)	82.7 (3.26)	885.1 (34.85)
Average precipitation days (≥ 1.0 mm)	18.3	17.5	17.7	13.9	14.8	14.6	16.4	15.1	15.5	16.9	19.3	19.1	200.7
Average relative humidity (%)	85.3	83.0	78.1	70.5	71.3	71.9	72.5	74.3	81.3	84.7	87.5	87.9	79.0
Mean monthly sunshine hours	51.1	65.0	111.6	169.6	199.2	195.7	211.0	190.4	137.2	104.1	47.1	42.4	1,497.1
Source: World Meteorological Organization

== Economy ==
As of 2026, cars are being built at the Volkswagen Osnabrück plant.

== Main sights ==
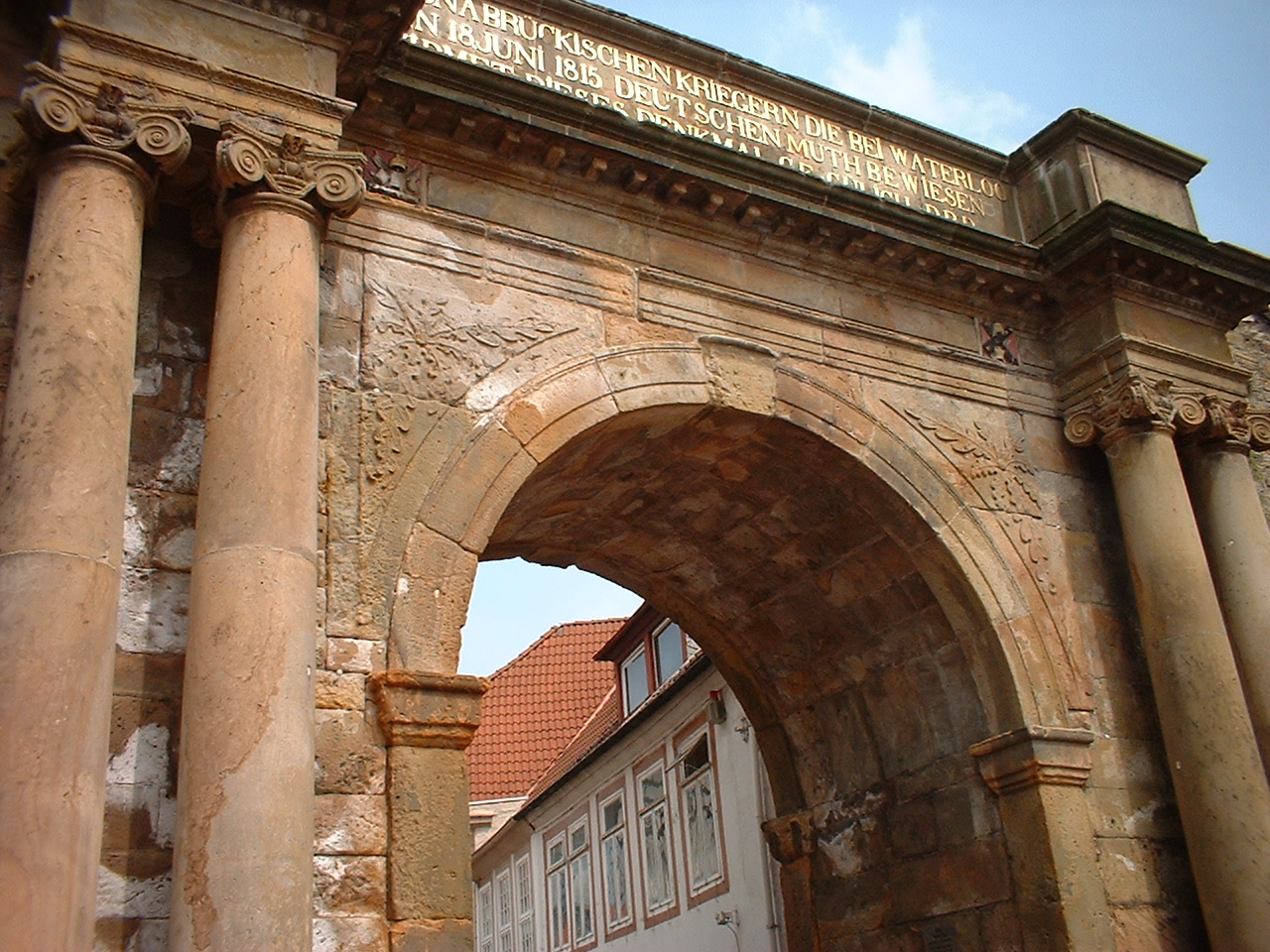
Heger Tor, a memorial to Elector Georg's 'German' Legion

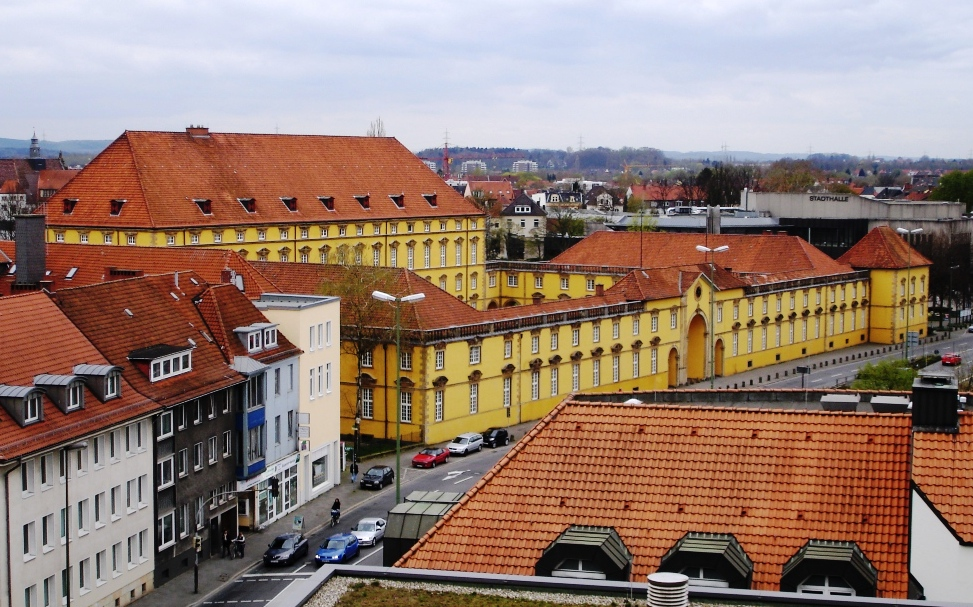
Osnabrück Palace

- Town Hall
- St. Peter's Cathedral, founded in the 11th century. It has two façade towers, originally the same size
- Gertrudenberg Monastery
- Marienkirche
- Heger Tor ("Heger Gate"), a monument to the soldiers from Osnabrück who died at the Battle of Waterloo in 1815
- Bucksturm, the oldest tower in the city, and once part of the city walls. It was once used as a prison for women accused of witchcraft
- Citizens' Fountain (1985), created to mark the city's 1200th birthday, by Hans Gerd Ruwe
- Gladiator 2000 (1986), a gigantic painting measuring (45 m × 6 m or 148 ft × 20 ft), by Nicu Covaci
- Felix Nussbaum Haus, a gallery and museum dedicated to the Jewish artist and painter Felix Nussbaum, who was murdered during the Holocaust. It was designed by the architect Daniel Libeskind
- Kalkriese Museum, situated on the battlefield of the Battle of the Teutoburger Wald in the Wiehen Hills, where German tribes under Arminius destroyed three Roman legions. It exhibits artefacts unearthed on the battlefield and tells the story of the battle
- Osnabrücker Schloss (castle/palace) 17th century Baroque construction, nowadays the main building of the University of Osnabrück. It is the place were George I of Great Britain died.
- Botanischer Garten der Universität Osnabrück, the university's botanical garden
- Old town with its small streets and medieval buildings
- Osnabrück Zoo
- Vitischanze – formerly a defence station in the north-west of the old city, it has the only undestroyed bridge in Europe with a defence walk below its surface. It is also the site of certain faculty of the University of Applied Science. It was earlier used as a casino
- Haseuferweg
- Katharinenkirche (St. Catherine's Church), which dates back to 1248 and is one of the 150 tallest churches in the world, and also the tallest medieval building in Lower Saxony
- Hyde Park, a traditional music hall established in 1976, a haven of pop music and youth culture
- Leysieffer, a traditional German chocolate producer founded in Osnabrück. The main Leysieffer site is in the city centre.

== Education ==
There are two higher education institutions in Osnabrück, University of Osnabrück and Osnabrück University of Applied Sciences with more than 25,000 students. All of the types of German grammar schools are represented in the city, including seven Gymnasien. Gymnasium Carolinum claims to be the oldest still existing school in Germany. Another well-known Gymnasium is the Ursulaschule, a private school, located directly opposite the Carolinum. The University of Osnabrück invested heavily in infrastructure to take on more students for the following years.

Osnabrück, Germany, offers several vocational schools (Berufsbildende Schulen, or BBS) that provide practical education and training across various fields. Here are some notable institutions

- Berufsbildende Schulen am Schölerberg (BBS am Schölerberg)
- Berufsbildende Schulen Brinkstraße (BBS Brinkstraße)
- Berufsbildende Schulen am Pottgraben (BBS am Pottgraben)

== Sport ==
The city's football team is VfL Osnabrück, founded in 1899. Currently, the team plays in the 3. Bundesliga. Its basketball team was founded the same year.

The Schlosswallhalle has been home to the GiroLive Panthers Osnabrück of the 1. Damen-Basketball-Bundesliga.

== Politics ==
The current mayor of Osnabrück is Katharina Pötter (CDU), elected in September 2021 and re-elected in September 2026.

Osnabrück is part of the electoral constituency Stadt Osnabrück for elections to the Bundestag.

== Transport ==
A Flixtrain in Osnabrück Hbf

The city of Osnabrück is connected by road to the A1, the A30 and the A33. It shares its airport with Münster.

Osnabrück Hauptbahnhof (central railway station) is an important rail travel hub. Travellers from the Netherlands heading to either Hamburg, Denmark, or Eastern Europe often have to change here.

An extensive bus network operated by the Stadtwerke Osnabrück (public utility provider) provides public transport within the city and the surrounding region. The central hub is situated on Neumarkt close to the main shopping street, roughly 10 minutes' walk from the railway station.

== Media ==
The regional public broadcaster, NDR, has a broadcast centre and studios in the city.

Local radio is served by NDR 1 Niedersachsen, Osradio 104.8, Radio Osnabrück, and Osna.FM.

Neue Osnabrücker Zeitung is the city's local newspaper that publishes daily.

== Districts ==
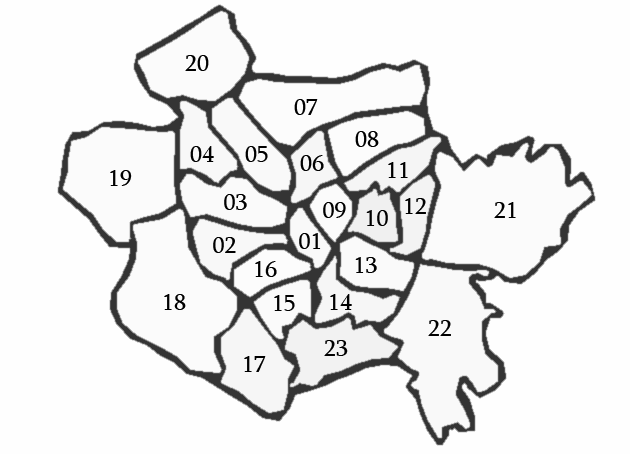
Boroughs of Osnabrück

The city is divided into 23 districts:

- 01 Innenstadt
- 02 Weststadt
- 03 Westerberg
- 04 Eversburg
- 05 Hafen
- 06 Sonnenhügel
- 07 Haste
- 08 Dodesheide
- 09 Gartlage
- 10 Schinkel
- 11 Widukindland
- 12 Schinkel-Ost
- 13 Fledder
- 14 Schölerberg
- 15 Kalkhügel
- 16 Wüste
- 17 Sutthausen
- 18 Hellern
- 19 Atter
- 20 Pye
- 21 Darum-Gretesch-Lüstringen
- 22 Voxtrup
- 23 Nahne

== Twin towns – sister cities ==
Osnabrück is twinned with:

- Haarlem, Netherlands (1961)
- Angers, France (1964)
- Gmünd, Austria (1971)
- Derby, England (1976)
- Greifswald, Germany (1988)
- Tver, Russia (1991)
- Evansville, United States (1991)
- Gwangmyeong, South Korea (1997)
- Çanakkale, Turkey (2004)
- Vila Real, Portugal (2005)
- Hefei, China (2006)

=== Twinning with Derby ===
Previously Osnabrück had made contact with the British authorities as early as 1948, hoping to find an English twin town and therefore achieve greater understanding with their former enemies in the Second World War. This attempt was unsuccessful and Osnabrück did not actively consider the idea again for another quarter-century. The twinning agreement with Derby was signed on 17 February 1976. Every year since then the two cities have exchanged envoys. Derby also has a square named after Osnabrück in honour of the twinning arrangement; this features an obelisk among other things.

== Notable people ==
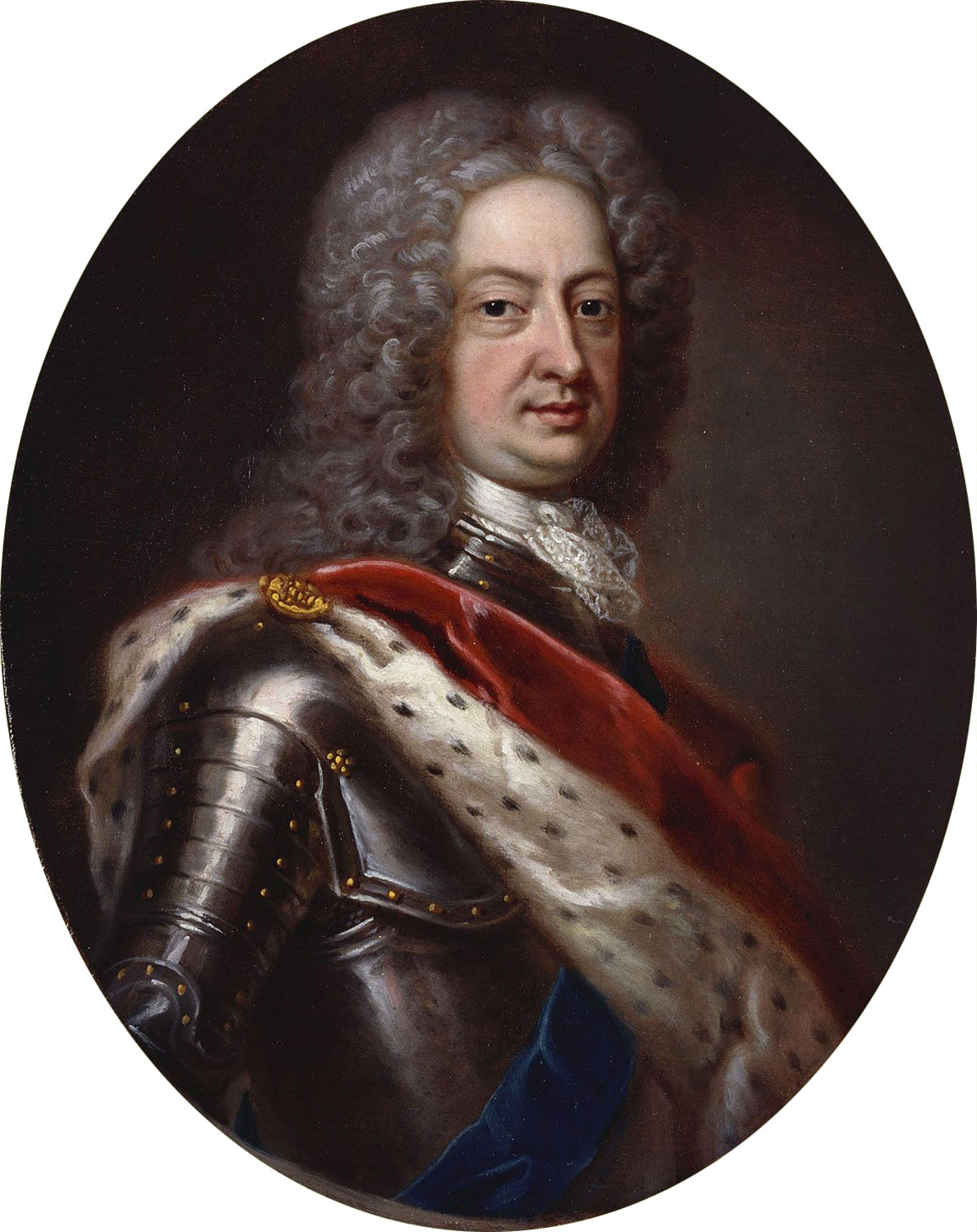
Ernest Augustus, Duke of York, c. 1740

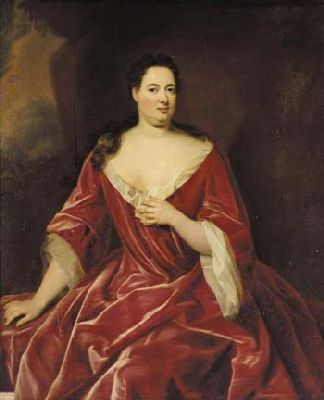
Sophia von Kielmansegg, Countess of Darlington, 18th century

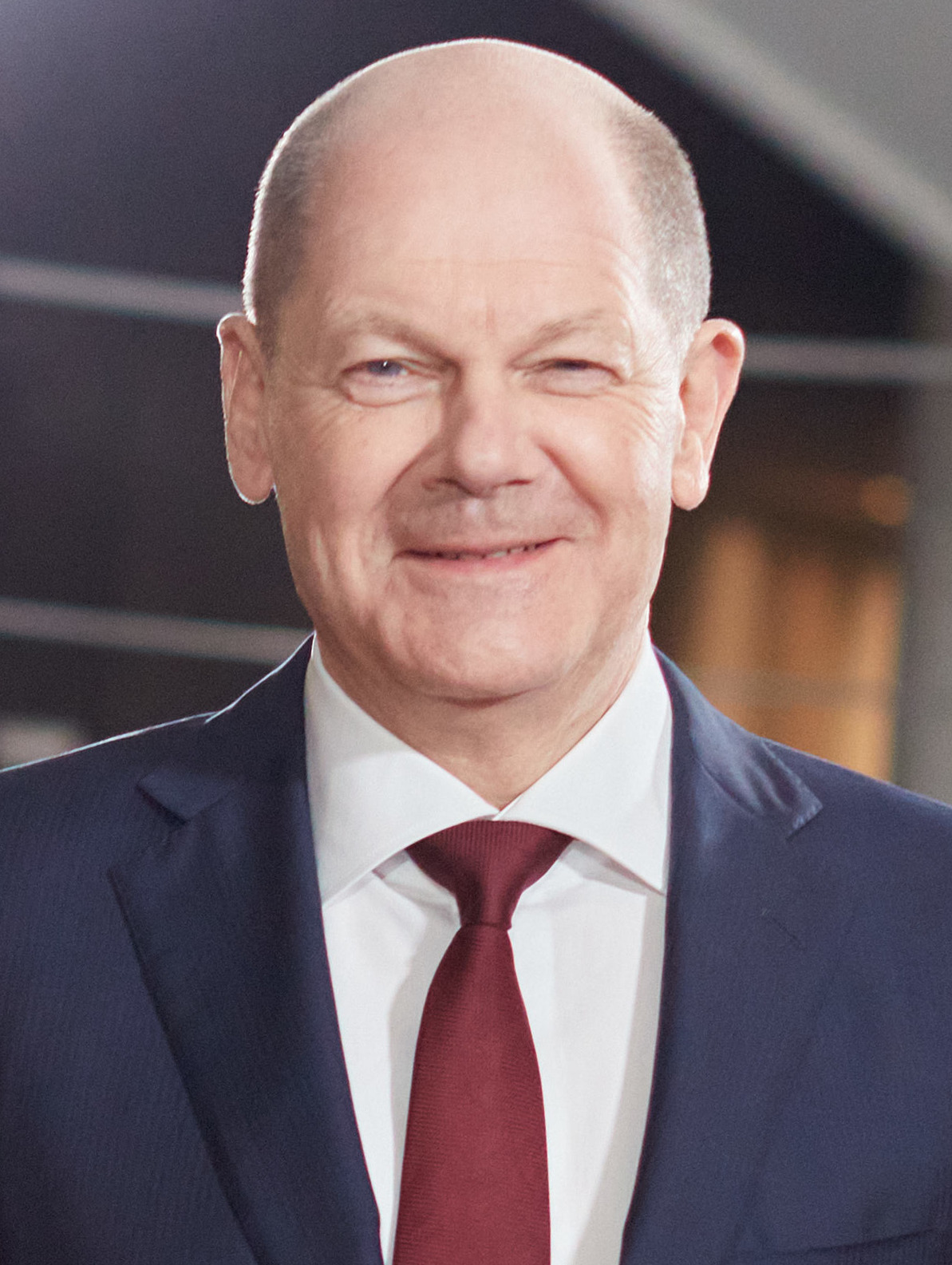
Olaf Scholz, 2022

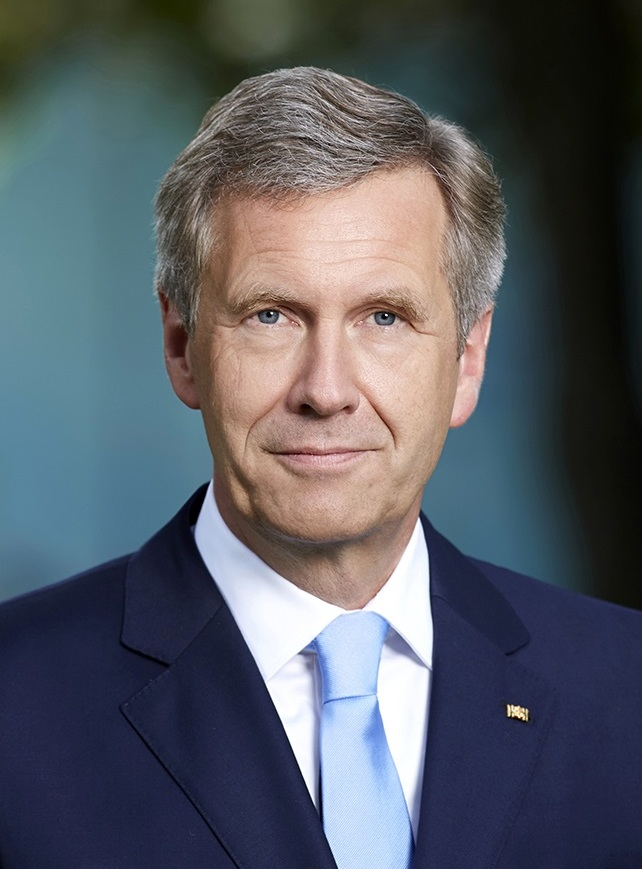
Christian Wulff, 2014

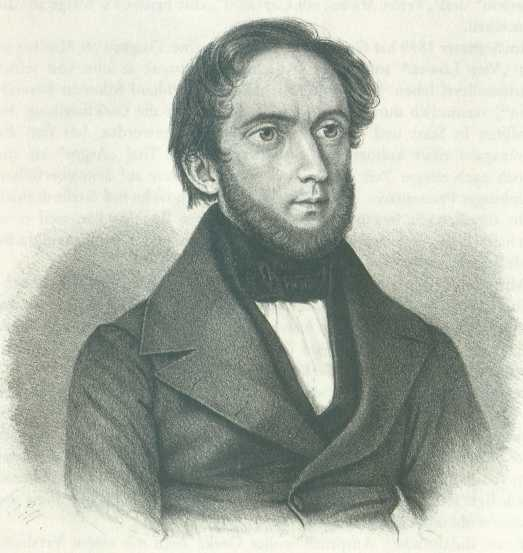
Friedrich Clemens Gerke, 1840

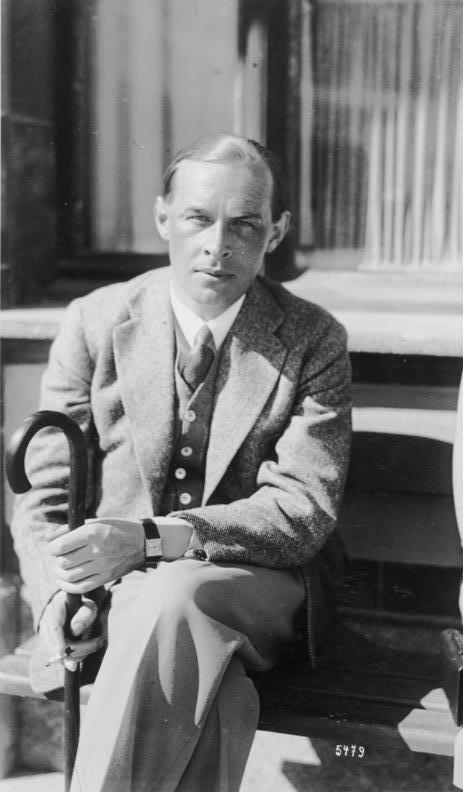
Erich Maria Remarque, 1929

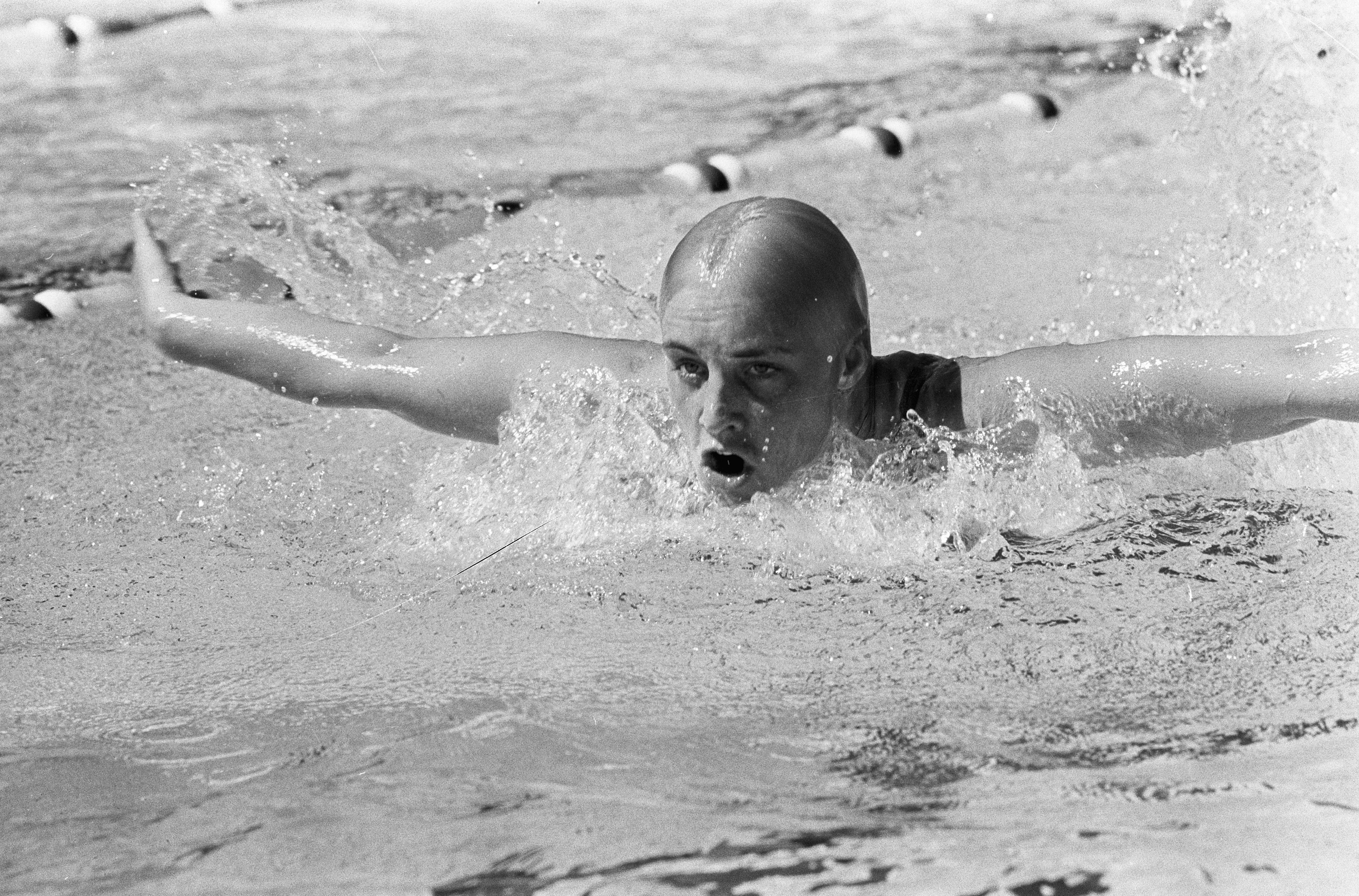
Heike Nagel (née Hustede), 1966

=== Public service & public thinking ===
- Benno II of Osnabrück (c. 1020 – 1088), Bishop of Osnabrück from 1068 to 1088
- Albert Suho (c. 1380 – c. 1450), clergyman, theologian, historian
- Friedrich Staphylus (1512–1564), theologian, first a Protestant, a Catholic convert
- Johann Wilhelm Petersen (1649–1727), evangelical theologian, mystic, and Millennialist
- Ernest Augustus, Duke of York and Albany (1674–1728), brother of George I of Great Britain
- Sophia von Kielmansegg, Countess of Darlington (1675–1725), courtier and a half-sister of George I of Great Britain
- Justus Möser (1720–1794), jurist and social theorist
- Ernst zu Münster (1766–1839), politician, statesman in the service of House of Hannover
- Justus von Gruner (1777–1820), a Prussian official, the first president of the Berlin Police
- Bernhard Rudolf Abeken (1780–1866), philologist
- Karl Fortlage (1806–1881), philosopher
- Heinrich Abeken (1809–1872), evangelical theologian
- Ludwig Windthorst (1812–1891), politician and leader of the Catholic Centre Party
- Friedrich Blass (1843–1907), classical scholar
- Georg Thieler (1854–1945), jurist and mayor of Jena from 1885 to 1889
- Friedrich Westmeyer (1873–1917), politician and trade unionist
- Walter Warlimont (1894–1976), General of the Artillery
- Hans Georg Calmeyer (1903–1972), attorney, Righteous Among the Nations
- Fritz Buntrock (1909–1948), SS officer and war criminal
- Rudolf Beckmann (1910–1943), SS-Oberscharführer and war criminal
- Franz Lucas (1911–1994), concentration camp doctor
- Wilhelm Schitli (1912–1945?), SS officer
- Hubertus Brandenburg (1923–2009), Bishop of Stockholm
- Peter van Pels (1926–1945) son of Auguste van Pels and Hermann van Pels, occupant at the Secret Annex in Amsterdam together with Anne Frank and her family
- Jürgen Kühling (1934–2019), lawyer, former judge at the Federal Constitutional Court between 1989 and 2001
- Rudolf Seiters (born 1937), politician (CDU), vice-president of the Bundestag 1998–2002
- Paul Kirchhof (born 1943), former judge of the Federal Constitutional Court, prof. of tax law
- Hans-Gert Pöttering (born 1945), lawyer and politician, former President of the European Parliament
- Ferdinand Kirchhof (born 1950), judge at the Federal Constitutional Court, professor of tax law
- Thomas Bellut (born 1955), journalist
- Olaf Scholz (born 1958), politician (SPD) and Chancellor of Germany from 2021 to 2025
- Christian Wulff (born 1959), politician and lawyer, President of Germany from 2010 to 2012
- Boris Pistorius (born 1960), politician, former Lord mayor of Osnabrück, Minister of Defence from 2023
- Anke Hennig (born 1964), politician (SPD)
- André Berghegger (born 1972), politician (CDU); from 2006 to 2013, mayor of the city of Melle
- Sabine R. Huebner (born 1976), ancient historian

=== The arts ===
- Gerlach Flicke (c. 1500–1558), painter, an artist of the Tudor court in London
- John Closterman (1660–1711), portrait painter, mostly of European noblemen and their families
- Friedrich Clemens Gerke (1801–1888), journalist, musician and pioneer of telegraphy; he revised the Morse code.
- Alfred Runge (1881–1946), architect
- Hinnerk Scheper (1897–1957), mural painter and architectural colourist, monument conservator and restorer
- Erich Maria Remarque (1898–1970), novelist, he wrote All Quiet on the Western Front in 1928
- Friedrich Vordemberge-Gildewart (1899–1962), a De Stijl painter
- Mathias Wieman (1902–1969), stage-performer, silent-and-sound motion picture actor from 1925 to 1966
- Felix Nussbaum (1904–1944), a surrealist painter
- Herbert Tiede (1915–1987), actor from 1943 to 1975.
- Benno Sterzenbach (1916–1985), cinema and theatre actor and director from 1948 to 1983
- Ursula Levy (born 1935), American author, child psychologist and Holocaust survivor
- Birgitta Tolksdorf (born 1947), German-American actress
- Markus Becker (born 1963), pianist
- Evelyn Herlitzius (born 1963), opera singer, and a dramatic soprano.
- Gentleman (born 1974), reggae musician, real name Tilmann Otto
- Robin Schulz (born 1987), musician, DJ and record producer
- Waterdown (1999–2012), hardcore punk band
- Henry Niemann (April 27, 1838 – October 26, 1899) was a pipe organ builder, who spent most of his career in Baltimore, Maryland. His organs were respected for their bold sound, fluid mechanisms, and quality construction.

=== Science & business ===
- Ludwig Clamor Marquart (1804–1881), pharmacist and entrepreneur; coined the term "anthocyanin".
- Hermann Kemper (1892–1977), engineer and pioneer in magnetic levitation
- Heinrich Wenner (1912–2008), antiquarian bookseller
- Wilhelm Karmann Jr. (1914–1998), motor industry entrepreneur with VW (Karmann)
- Reinhold Remmert (1930–2016), mathematician, wrote two books on number theory and complex analysis
- Inge Schmitz-Feuerhake (born 1935), physicist and mathematician
- Hans Huchzermeyer (born 1939), physician and musicologist
- Cathrin Brisken (born 1967), medical doctor, researches the hormonal control of breast cancer

=== Sport ===
- Horst Borcherding (1930–2015), a football goalkeeper; he played 254 games.
- Heike Nagel (born 1946), former swimmer, team bronze medallist at the 1968 Summer Olympics
- Thomas Möllenkamp (born 1961), a retired rower, team gold medallist at the 1988 Summer Olympics
- Volker Fried (born 1961), former field hockey player, team gold medallist at the 1992 Summer Olympics
- Stefani Werremeier (born 1968), a rower, team silver medallist at the 1992 Summer Olympics
- Daniel Flottmann (born 1984), footballer who has played over 490 games
- Felix Klaus (born 1992), footballer who has played over 330 games
- Carolin Schnarre (born 1992), a Paralympic equestrian, team silver medallist at the 2016 Paralympic Games

== See also ==
- Lagerhalle - cultural centre
- Ossensamstag – annual parade
- Steckenpferdreiten
- Route of Megalithic Culture, tourist route from Osnabrück to Oldenburg via some 33 megalithic sites
- IHK Osnabrück – Emsland – Grafschaft Bentheim, an industry association

== General references ==
- Panayi, P. (2007), Life and Death in a German Town: Osnabrück from the Weimar Republic to World War II and Beyond, New York: Tauris Academic Studies ISBN 978-0-85771-440-4
- Team Strategische Stadtentwicklung und Statistik (August 2013), 02001 Amtliche Einwohnerzahlen der Stadt Osnabrück und der angrenzenden Gemeinden Stand: Volkszählung 25.5.1987 und jeweils 31.12. (PDF) (in German), City of Osnabrück, p. 1
