= Heinrich Wenner =

Heinrich Theodor Wenner (Osnabrück, Germany, 1912–2008) was an antiquarian bookseller. Wenner, along with the city of Osnabrück, organized Germany's first reading competition in the early 1950s and is thus considered the creator of this competition.
