= Sonnenhügel =

Human settlement in Germany

Coordinates: 52.2833°N 8.0333°E

Sonnenhügel is a district of Osnabrück, Germany, located over the northern border of the Innenstadt (city centre) district.

== Location and character ==
The district of Sonnenhügel is located in the north of the city. To the south it borders on the Innenstadt – around the area of the Osnabruck-Altstadt train station – and also along the Lange Wand (Long Wall) of the Gartlage district, which stretches along the premises of KM Europa Metal. The district's northwestern border runs along Nette, Bramscher Straße and part of Hansastraße. The border with Dodesheide in the east runs through the Landwehrgraben.

The district covers an area of 3.19 km^{2}. As of 30 April 2012, it had a population of 8,782 residents. Roughly 58.7% of this total was made up of single-person households (as of late 2009). Sonnenhügel's population is characterised by its high proportion of persons in the 40-65 age bracket; as of the end of 2011 more than 3,000 people in this age group lived here. Roughly 7.1% of the local population is of foreign descent (as of 31 December 2011).

Due to its reasonable rent costs and proximity to the city centre, Sonnenhügel is primarily a residential area. The area is largely devoid of significant industry and pedestrian zones. The district enjoys some green zone in the forms of the Bürgerpark (citizens’ park) and the Hasefriedhof (Hase Cemetery). Little traffic congestion, as well as various leisure opportunities, makes the district attractive to families. The district had the second-highest proportion of British families (after Dodesheide) until the removal of the British Armed Forces HQ. The departure of the largest garrison outside of the UK freed up additional residential space in the north of the district.

== History ==
The oldest surviving maps of Osnabrück, dating from 1633, do not show Sonnenhügel as being a part of the city; instead it is situated in front of the city gates (specifically the Hasetor, or Hase Gate). Next to no similarities with the later arrangement of the city's districts are evident. In front of the Hasetor – part of the former city wall – stands the Gertrudenberg, which since the 12th century had been the location of a monastery. The elevation, a part of today's Sonnenhügel district, was of strategic significance – not only did it allow clear views over the city, this area north of the city was particularly well-suited for military operations.

At the start of the 19th century, most of the territory which makes up today's district belonged to the “Hasser Laischaft”. The Laischaften (people's groupings) were self-administering bodies; some still exist today, such as the Herrenteichslaischaft and Heger Laischaft. Reminders of the Laischaften can be found at various points across the city – such as the Haselaischaftsweg in Sonnenhügel.

The expansion of the city also saw plenty of development in the Sonnenhügel area. Of particular note is the construction of the “Irrenanstalt” (today a pejorative term similar to “lunatic asylum”) on the Gertrudenburg in 1868, and that of a similar institution on Knollstraße in 1864.

Little public attention is given to the caverns located underneath the Gertrudenberg. The 900-metre long branched tunnel network is the subject of various myths. The caverns came into being during the 14th century with the establishment of a quarry on the Getrudenberg. During World War II the underground complex was used as an air-raid shelter by several thousand people.

== Leisure ==
Sonnenhügel offers a number of recreational opportunities. The north of the district is home to the Nettebad; following renovation work in 2005 it has been able to market itself as a key hotspot for activity, swimming and wellness, and is also renowned throughout the wider region. Alongside several slides and recreational pools, the Nettebad also has competitive swimming lanes both inside and outside the main building, as well as sauna facilities connected to the main swimming area.

Directly opposite the Nettebad – on Verther Landstraße – is the Eissportcenter Osnabrück (Osnabrück Ice Rink). However, the ice rink itself is only accessible during the winter months; it is converted into a standard roller-skating rink in time for summer.

A BMX course is also situated behind the ice-skating hall.

== Transportation ==
Bus lines 32/33 (towards Nettebad) and 31/51/52/53 (towards Dodesheide) have stops in the Sonnenhügel area, on Süntelstraße, Lerchenstraße and Knollstraße respectively. There is a stop on Bramscher Straße on lines 81/82 (towards Pye) and 41 (towards Haste).

Together with the Vehrter Landstraße, these roads make up the busiest artery in the district. Noise levels here can sometimes reach up to 75 dB.

Sonnenhügel formerly had a connection to the tram network on line 2, which ran from Haste via Bramscher Straße, Hasetor, Nikolaiort and Neumarkt towards Schölerberg.

== Churches ==
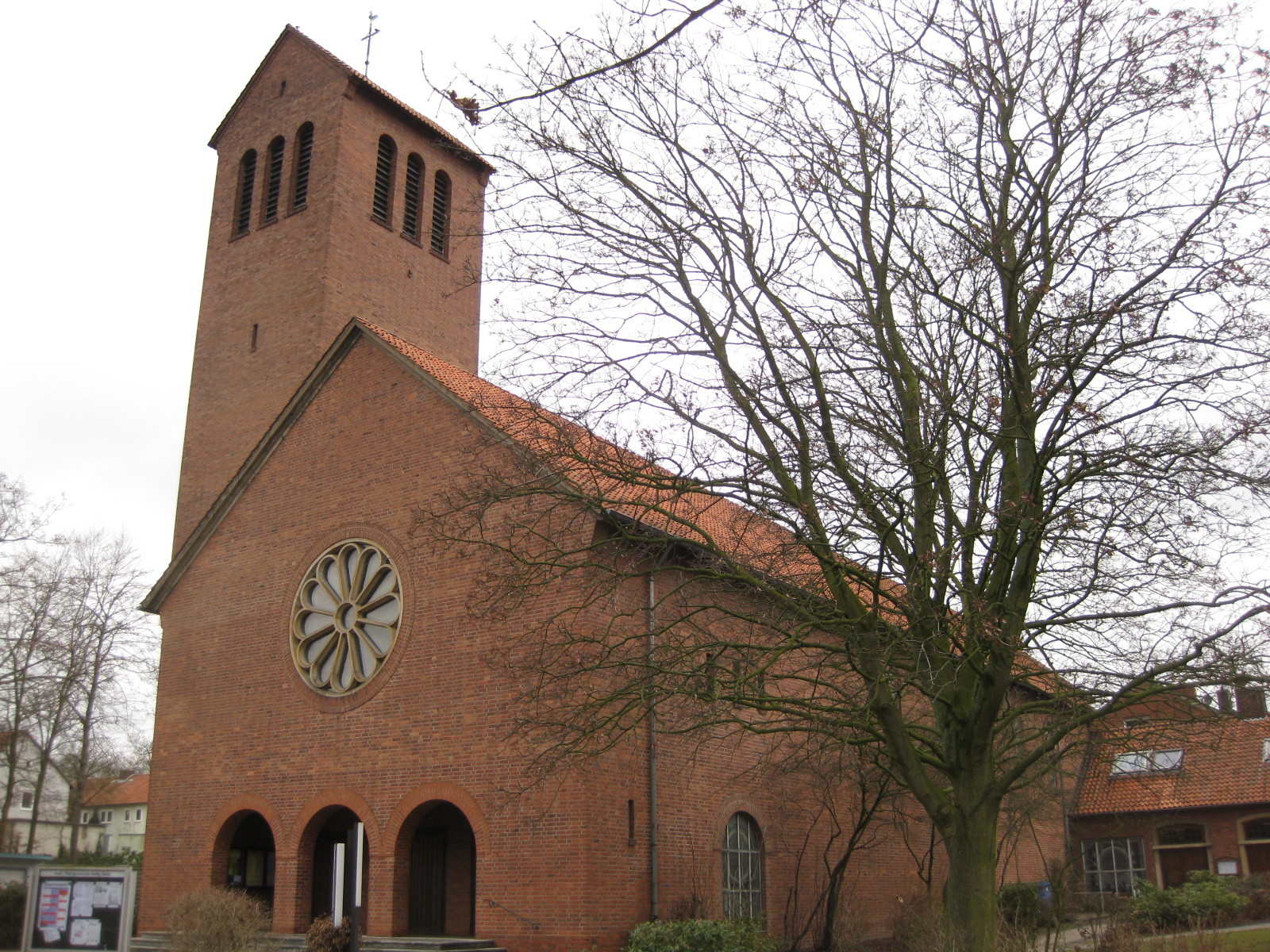
The Heilig Geist (Holy Spirit) church (Roman Catholic)

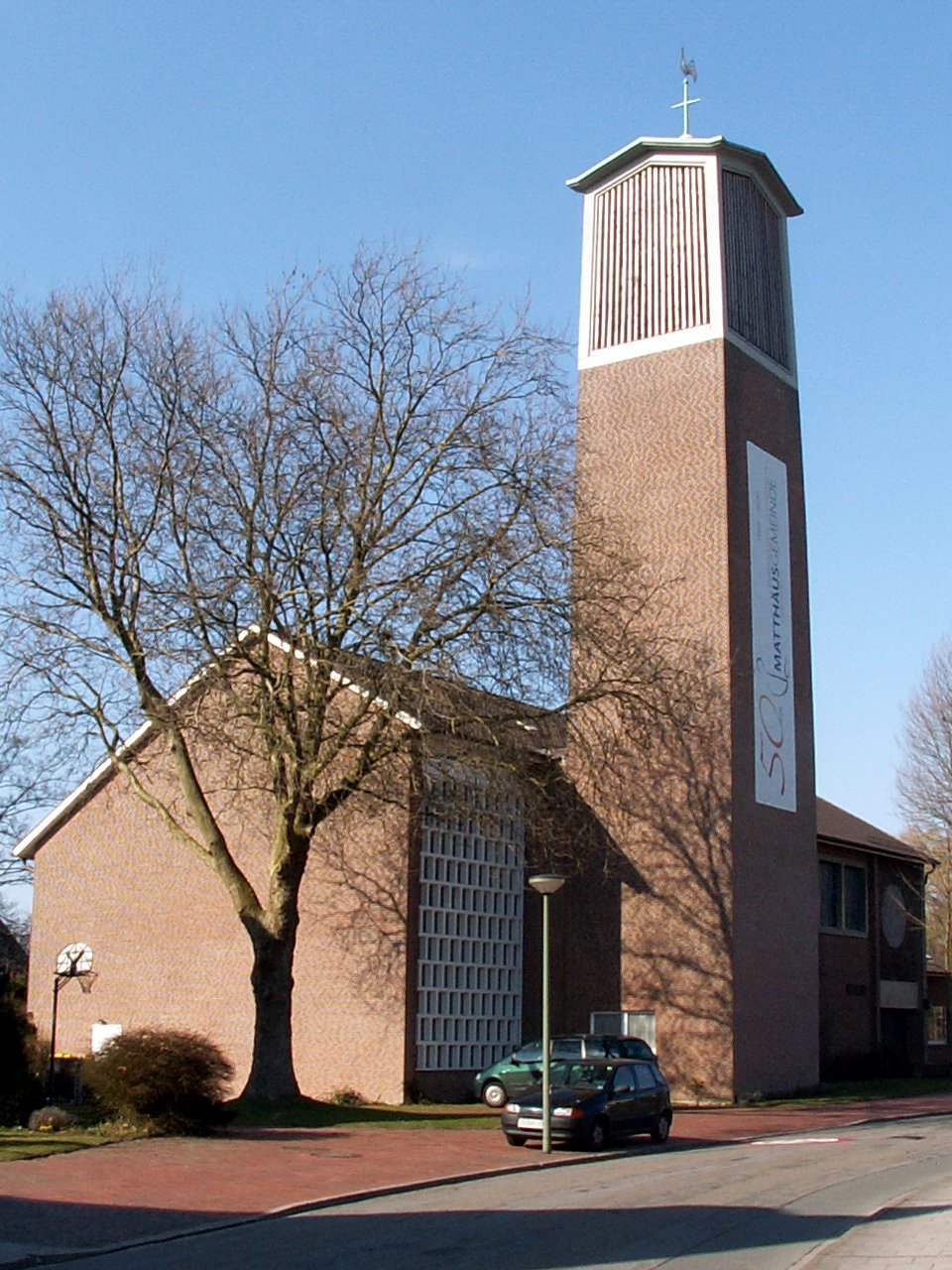
The Matthäuskirche (St. Matthew's Church, Protestant)

Sonnenhügel is home to several churches – along with their respective parishes, the Roman Catholic Heilig Geist church is located on Lerchenstraße and the Protestant Matthäuskirche on Moorlandstraße. Also located on Moorlandstraße is the former Reformed Protestant Erlöserkirche (Church of the Redeemer); the building was taken over by the Greek Orthodox Church in May 2010. Between the Bürgerpark and Knollstraße lies the Gertrudenberg monastery, on the hill which shares its name. The Getrudenkirche also remains standing along the former abbesses’ building. This church currently functions as a Simultaneum (shared church). Today a private psychiatric clinic is located on the grounds of the former monastery.

== Schools ==
Being a residential area, the Sonnenhügel district is also home to several schools, which often interact with one another.

The municipal Albert-Schweitzer-Schule has been situated on Lerchenstraße since 1956. Around 150 pupils are taught at the primary school, which shares buildings and a playground with the Heilig-Geist-Schule. Founded in 1960, this school (also a primary) is primarily oriented towards pupils from Catholic families. Every year the children take part in the traditional Steckenpferdreiten parade.

The Schulzentrum Sonnenhügel (Sonnenhügel School Complex, formerly the Schulzentrum Sebastopol) is located only a few hundred metres away. This is where the Ernst-Moritz-Arndt-Gymnasium, Wittekind-Realschule and Felix-Nussbaum-Schule are located; together appearing to constitute one secondary school. Nearby is the Anne-Frank-Schule, a special school for pupils with physical and motor disabilities, along with the Mensa (canteen), school complex gymnasium and the district sports centre, which is also used by SSC Dodesheide. The Sophie-Scholl-Orientierungsstufe (orientation-level school) existed until 2004.

The first school building on Knollstraße was built in 1975, at first occupied by the Orientierungsstufe Sebastopol. By 1982 all the schools situated here today had moved into the building complex. The Ernst-Moritz-Arndt-Gymnasium had previously been located on Lotterstraße; among its famous alumni is the former German state president Christian Wulff. The school complex had to undergo major renovation work following a serious fire in February 2001.

== Sport ==
In spite of its name, the sports club SSC Dodesheide is in fact based on Reinhold-Tiling-Weg in the Sonnenhügel district. Founded in 1962, the club offers a wide range of sport-related activities and is one of the largest in the city with a total of 2,800 members. In the immediate area there are numerous tennis, football and athletics grounds as well as the gymnasium of the Schulzentrum Sonnenhügel.

Closer to the city centre, the Osnabrücker Tennis-Club e.V. has been based on Suntelstraße since 1908. The club's facilities include an indoor tennis centre, a clubhouse and several playing courts.

== Other ==
The district's name is linked to the slight elevation encountered around the area of Hügelstraße in the north. The 97-metre-high Gertrudenberg, located towards the south side of the district, has nothing to do with the nomenclature.

An independent public newspaper – the Haste-Dodesheide-Sonnenhügel-Töne – is published at irregular intervals in the city's three adjoined northern districts.
