= Ursula Levy =

American author and child psychologist

Ursula Levy (born May 11, 1935 - August 2019) was an American author, child psychologist and Holocaust survivor. Her research on childhood depression was published in the Journal of School Health. She has been published in a number of other medical journals such as the Journal of Nursing Education. Her memoirs of her childhood entitled The Incredible Years were published in 1994 to commemorate the 50th anniversary of the liberation of the Netherlands from Nazi Germany.

== Early life ==
Levy was born in Osnabrück, Germany to Max and Lucia Levy. Her father and uncle were arrested and later imprisoned in Sachsenhausen concentration camp. Both men were eventually released in poor health and died in early 1939. Events of World War II were further unfolding in Germany; with the help of a family member living in the United States, Levy was sent along with her brother George to the Netherlands, specifically a children's home at a convent in Eersel, where they were baptized Catholic. Joseph Von Macklenbergh, a leader of a Catholic organization in the Netherlands informed Nazi officials upon inspection that the Levy siblings had one American parent, and this lie may have possibly helped them survive.

The Nazis invaded the Netherlands in May 1940. After reviewing the Convent's records, the Nazis deported Levy, her brother, and other Jewish children in hiding to Vught concentration camp in April 1943. On several occasions, the siblings avoided a transfer to Auschwitz again with the help of Von Macklenbergh. Instead, they were both sent to Bergen-Belsen concentration camp. In her memoirs, Levy writes that an assignment to Auschwitz would have been a death sentence, but being sent to Bergen-Belsen would mean that she and her brother may have hope for survival. In April 1945, some prisoners including Levy and her brother were forced on a train that circled the camp for thirteen days until they were liberated by Soviet soldiers near Tröbitz, Germany. Shortly after being liberated, the Levys were sent to the United States in 1947, where they settled with family members in Chicago.

== Scholarly work ==
Levy earned a bachelor of science degree in nursing, along with a teaching certificate, which would allow her to work as a school nurse. While employed by Chicago Public Schools, she would go on to earn a master of science degree in psychiatric nursing from the University of Illinois at Urbana–Champaign. She found a niche in clinical experiences in individual, group, and family therapy. "Not only was I expected to interpret the client's responses but I had to analyze my own inner reactions, and suggest ways to improve the therapeutic process," Levy writes in her memoirs. She references Jewish philosopher Martin Buber as a major influence on her work, naming the inner dialogue she had to impose to bring herself to peace with her upbringing.

Her first scholarly article, "Parent and Teacher Perception of Depression in Children" was published in November 1985. Levy's study correlated depression in children with parental perceptions and with teacher report card ratings of school achievement and adjustment. She interviewed two hundred and twenty children age six to twelve years using the Children's Depression Rating Scale. The study found that depressed students achieved at grade level in reading and math, but received lower grades for effort than nondepressed students.

== Present day ==
In 2005, Levy wrote and published a book titled The Spirit Builder, a biography of Dorothy Becker, a woman who organized a group of German-Jewish refugees to establish a retirement home in post-war Chicago. After her retirement from Chicago Public Schools in the late 1990s, Levy continues to volunteer at the SelfHelp Home in Chicago.
