= Gartlage =

District of Osnabrück, Lower Saxony, Germany

Coordinates: 52.2917°N 8.0687°E

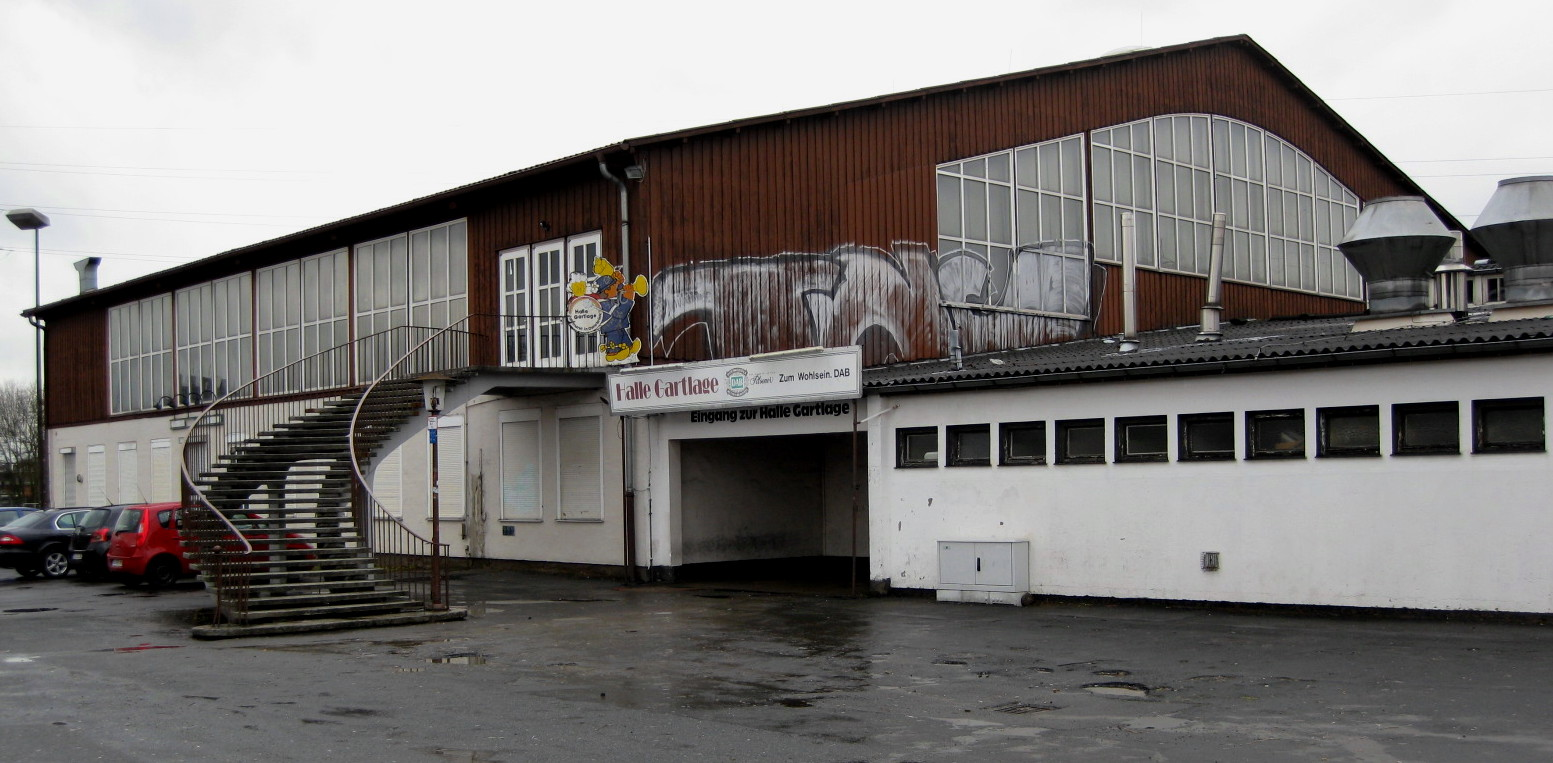
The Halle Gartlage (Gartlage Hall)

Gartlage is a district of the city of Osnabrück, Lower Saxony, Germany. It is situated next to the Innenstadt (city centre).

As of late 2008 the Gartlage district was home to 2,403 households comprising 3,644 residents; a rise of 24 residents from the previous year. The district has a land area of 169.2 hectares, making it the second smallest in Osnabrück after the Innenstadt (163 hectares).

The district is home to the Halle Gartlage (Gartlage Hall), which was originally built in 1954 for auctioning cattle. Today it is also used for concerts, flea markets and various other events. Osnabrück’s biannual Jahrmärkte (fairs) take place around the area of the hall. The hall used to be the location of a railway platform for special train journeys on the Osnabrück-Bremen line.

The district formerly had a link to the tram network on line 3, which ran from Schinkel to Martiniplatz/Heinrich-Lübke-Platz via Buersche Straße and Neumarkt. Another tram line running from the Innenstadt towards Bremer Straße via Alte Poststraße and Bohmte Straße had also been planned but never became operational. However, tracks were set up underneath Bremer Brücke (Bremer Bridge).

The Klushügel sports centre has both grass and hard-surfaced playing courts along with additional facilities for athletic sports etc.
