= Steckenpferdreiten =

Custom in Osnabrück, Lower Saxony, Germany

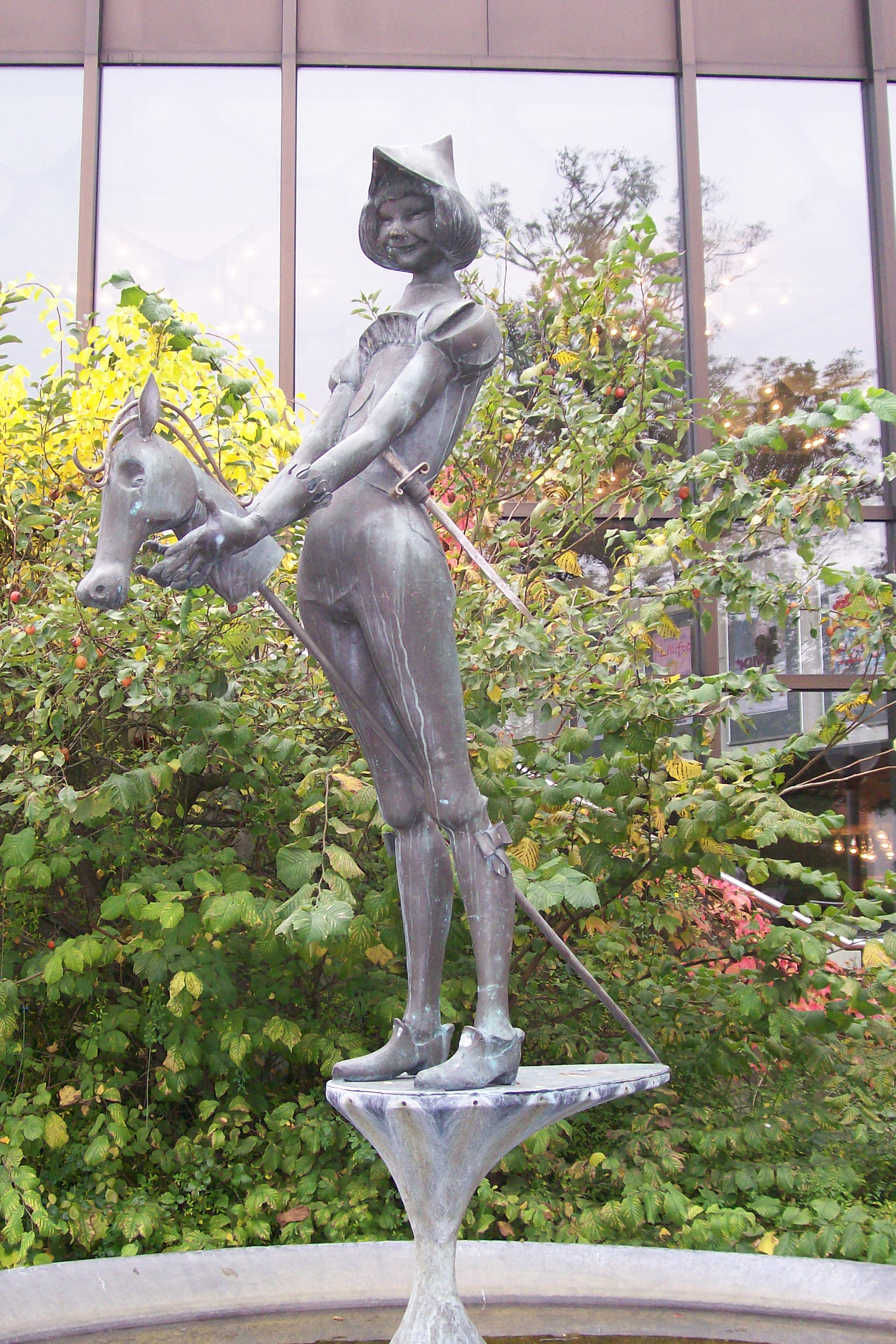
Steckenpferdreiter outside the Stadthalle Osnabruck (Osnabruck civic centre)

Steckenpferdreiten (English: hobby horse riding) is a custom of the city of Osnabrück, Lower Saxony, Germany commemorating the peace agreement of 1648 by which the Thirty Years' War was concluded.

The peace festival first took place on 22 October 1948 to mark the 300-year anniversary of the Treaty of Westphalia, which had been negotiated and signed in Osnabrück and Münster. Every year since 1953, year four (primary) school pupils have gathered on or around 25 October – the day on which peace was declared – and "ridden" their hobby horses to the Rathaus (at first only male pupils were allowed to participate). The procession is followed by a children's festival in the centre of the Altstadt.

== History ==
Osnabrück's Steckenpferdreiten tradition finds its origins in a tale from Nuremberg. During the Nuremberg Execution Day in 1650 a group of boys had "ridden" with their hobby horses to Count Octavio Piccolomini, the leader of the delegation sent by Emperor Ferdinand III, to ask him to find a way to commemorate the peace. In response he had square silver coins minted, depicting on one side the boys carrying hobby horses (these coins have been historically documented).

The story was also picked up on by the poets Clara and Emmy von Dincklage in their 1875 work Geschichtenbuch für die Jugend (Book of Stories for Youth), who changed the setting to Osnabrück. Stimulated further by the Osnabrück author and cultural historian Ludwig Bäte, the Steckenpferdreiten became a local tradition. Initially only boys were allowed to participate, as was outlined in a local history work from 1956 about schools in the city and surrounding district of Osnabrück. Eventually increasing numbers of girls began to take part; since the mid-1970s all local pupils in the fourth year of primary school have been invited to participate.

The children "ride" towards the town hall of Osnabrück – in whose historic Friedenssaal (Hall of Peace) the 1648 peace treaty was signed - with their home-made hobby horses and colourful paper hats. The procession is led by city pipers. The children are welcomed by the Lord Mayor and given sweet pretzels while passing over the town hall steps. A special Steckenpferdreiter song was composed for the festival; its first line goes "Wir Reiter ziehn durch Osnabrück und singen für den Frieden" ("We riders march through Osnabrück and sing for peace").

== Miscellaneous ==
In October 2006 more than 1,400 Osnabrück schoolchildren took part in the event, along with pupils from its Turkish twin city Çanakkale.

In Osnabrück's American friendship city Evansville, Indiana a Steckenpferdreiten event took place in 1998, the 350th anniversary of the Treaty of Westphalia; it was organised by local people of German origin and held at the city's Oktoberfest. Pupils from Osnabrück also travelled to Evansville to take part.

An exhibition entitled Zur Geschichte des Osnabrücker Steckenpferdreitens (History of the Steckenpferdreiten in Osnabrück) was held at the city's Dreikronenhaus from 6 to 29 October 2004.

A bronze Steckenpferdreiter monument made by local sculptor Hans Gerd Ruwe was set up in front of Osnabrück's Stadthalle; subsequently it was moved to the Katharinenkirche.

== Literature ==
- Schirmeyer, L. (ed), Osnabrücker Sagenbuch (Osnabrück, 7th edition, 1987 (originally published 1920))
- von Dincklage, C. & E., Die Steckenpferd-Reiter. In: Geschichtenbuch für die Jugend (Stuttgart, 1875), p. 133-5

== Links ==
- Osnabrück Schulmuseum (School Museum), featuring detailed information on the Steckenpferdreiten and its history
- Steckenpferdreiten webpage at the Evangelical Lutheran State Church of Hannover with photo of Steckenpferdreiter plastic
- Die Kinder und das Steckenpferd: "Wir Reiter zieh'n durch Osnabrück " – Hamburger Abendblatt article marking 50 years of the Steckenpferdreiten
