= Albert Suho =

Albert Suho (before 1390 - after 1449) was a cleric and writer. He enjoyed a successful church career in his home town of Osnabrück, and represented the town at the Council of Basel. He wrote a number of theological works in Latin and a world chronicle in Middle Low German.

Suho's chronicle runs from the creation of the world until 1447 (1452 in a second edition), focussing on the city of Osnabrück in the latter parts. Most of the text is standard material from usual sources (Petrus Riga, Martin of Opava), but the latter parts are important sources for local ecclesiastical history.

Until recently the chronicle was known only in one manuscript (Berlin/Kraków) but two more have recently been discovered (Warburg in the 1990s, Leiden in 2012).
