= Pye (Osnabrück district) =

Coordinates: 52.3222°N 7.9972°E

- District
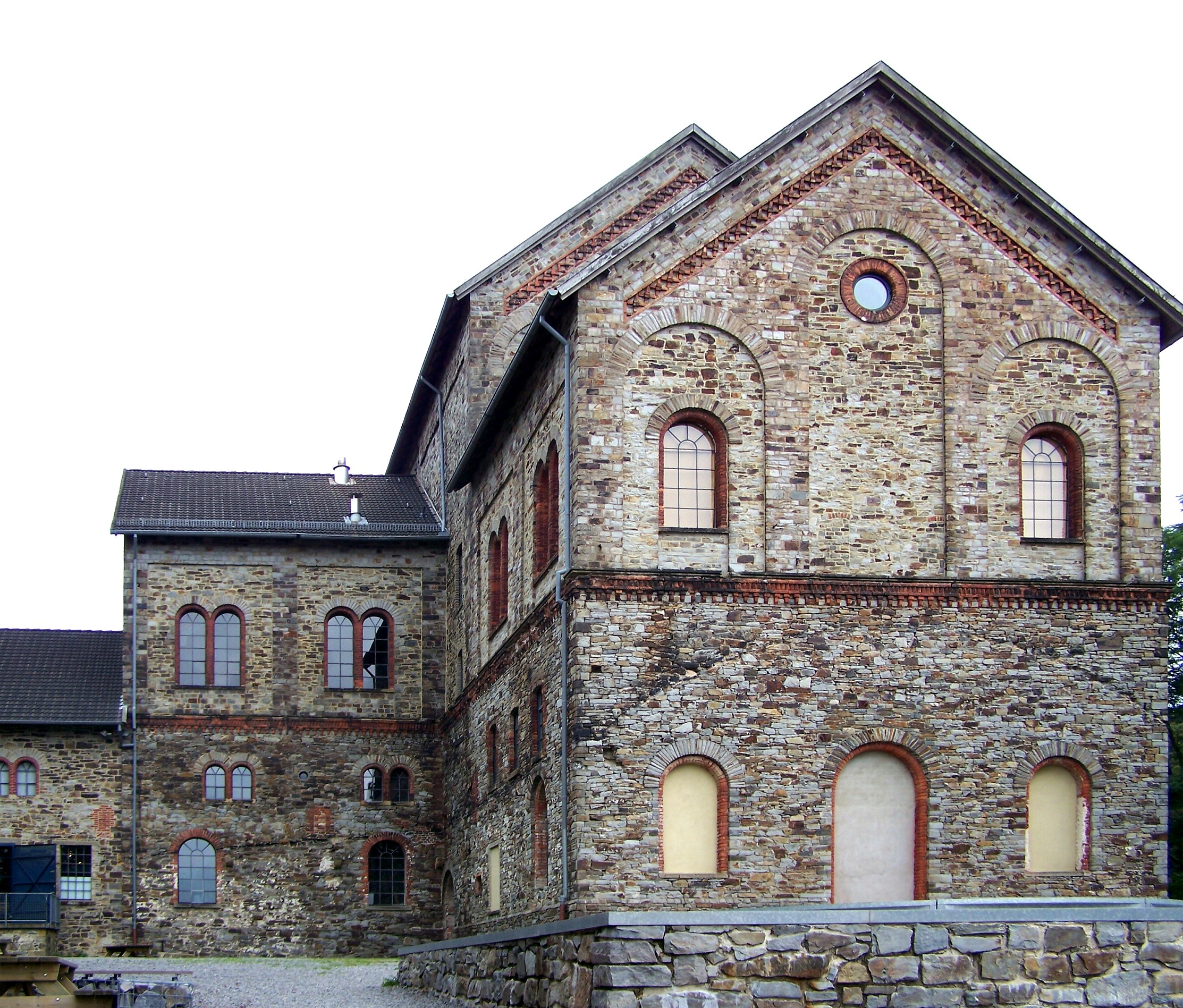
- The Haseschacht (Hase Pit) on the Piesberg, now the Museum Industriekultur (Museum of Industrial Culture).

- Location of Pye in Germany
- Country: Germany
- State: Lower Saxony
- City: Osnabrück
- Established: Until 1972 (as a separate village)

Pye is a district of the city of Osnabrück, Germany. Its positioning in the countryside on the outskirts of Osnabrück and its good transport connections to the city make it an appealing area for residents.

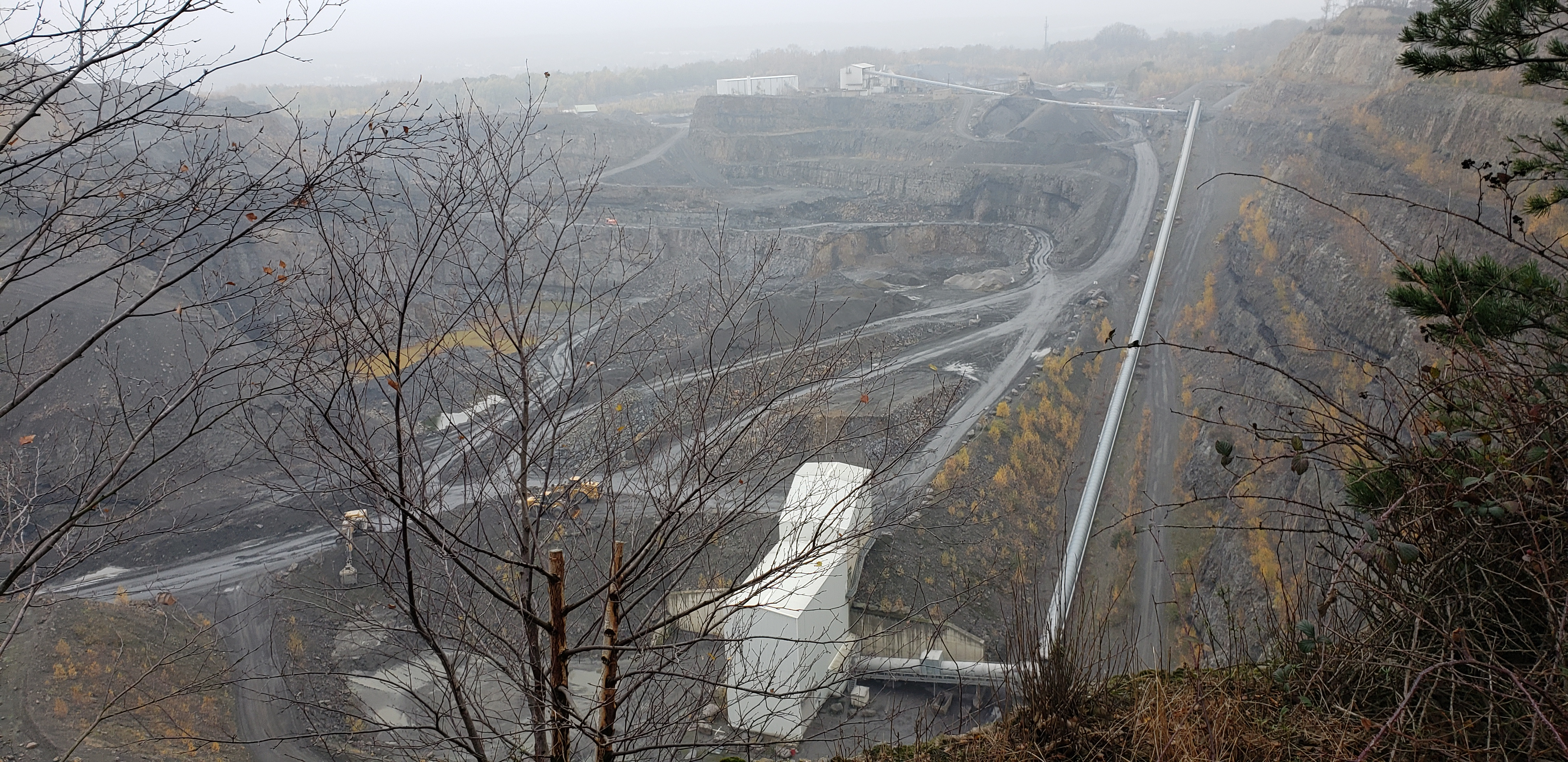
The Piesberg

Until 1972 Pye was a separate village in the district of Osnabrück. It belonged to the parish of St. Johann (St. John) in Osnabrück and was a predominantly Catholic area. Agriculture formed the backbone of the local economy. On 1 July 1972 it became a district of Osnabrück; since 1978 it has had its own parish (St. Matthias).

Pye is also the location of the Piesberg (derived from "Pyes Berg" (Pye's Mountain)). Coal mining took place here during the 19th and 20th centuries. Even today, stones continue to be mined from the Piesberg quarry. The Piesberg was also the location of the largest landfill site in the Osnabrück region until June 2006. The Museum Industriekultur (Museum of Industrial Culture) is situated on the Piesberg, giving insight into the history of mining on the mountain.

In Pye there is a street called "Am Pyer Ding". This is in reference to the Old German term "Thing" - meaning that Pye was also the location of such a "Thing".

The countryside surrounding Pye is mostly characterised by small to medium-sized woods, grassland and a branch canal, which is an offshoot of the Mittelland Canal.

The Osnabrück-Piesberg railway station is located at the edge of the district - currently it is only used for special train journeys (using steam locomotives) on event days, travelling there from the central station in Osnabrück via the Osnabrück-Altstadt station.

== Piesberg ==
Located north of Osnabrück and the southern edge of the Wiehen Hills, Piesberg is the core of the UNESCO Global Geopark TERRA.vita. One of the largest European quarries, Piesberg is an anticline formed during the Alpine orogeny, and noted for its extensive Upper Carboniferous coal seams, siltstones and sandstones. The anthracite coal and quartzitic cemented sandstone indicate thermal heating, perhaps due to the postulated Bramscher pluton. The earliest use of the sandstones was in the Neolithic construction of the Funnelbeaker culture Karlsteine tomb. Limonitic iron ore was mined from pingens in the 12th century, and coal in the 15th century. In 1568, the city of Osnabrück granted coal concessions and the first mine shafts were dug. In 1868, these mines reached below the level of groundwater. Notable mine shafts include the Hase-Schacht, Schacht Franz, Wetterschacht 4, Stüve-Schacht and AlterSchacht 7. Ranging in thickness from 0.3 to 1.5 meters, notable coal seams include the Flöze Zweibänke, Flöze Dreibänke, Flöze Mittel, and the Flöze Johannisstein. The coal was used in the Georgsmarienhütte and Osnabrück steelworks. By 1898, however, coal mining had ceased. Quartizitic sandstone has been quarried since 1859, with one million metric tonnes extracted in 2018. The coal seams continue to be the source of noteworthy fossils. Plant fossils include examples of Sphenophyllum, Sigillaria, Pecopteris and Cordaites. Insect fossils include Blattodea, Palaeodictyoptera, Meganeuridae, Arthropleura, Meganisoptera and Trigonotarbida. Animal fossils include Microconchida and Xiphosura. The southern portion of the quarry was used as a city landfill from 1975 until 2006. The quarry floor is 100 meters below the former surface, while the removed overburden is found along the flanks. Evidence of past ice ages is found in sandstone glacial striations and loess deposited on the southern and eastern slopes.
