= Osnabrück Town Hall =

Historic German building

Coordinates: 52.2774°N 8.0412°E

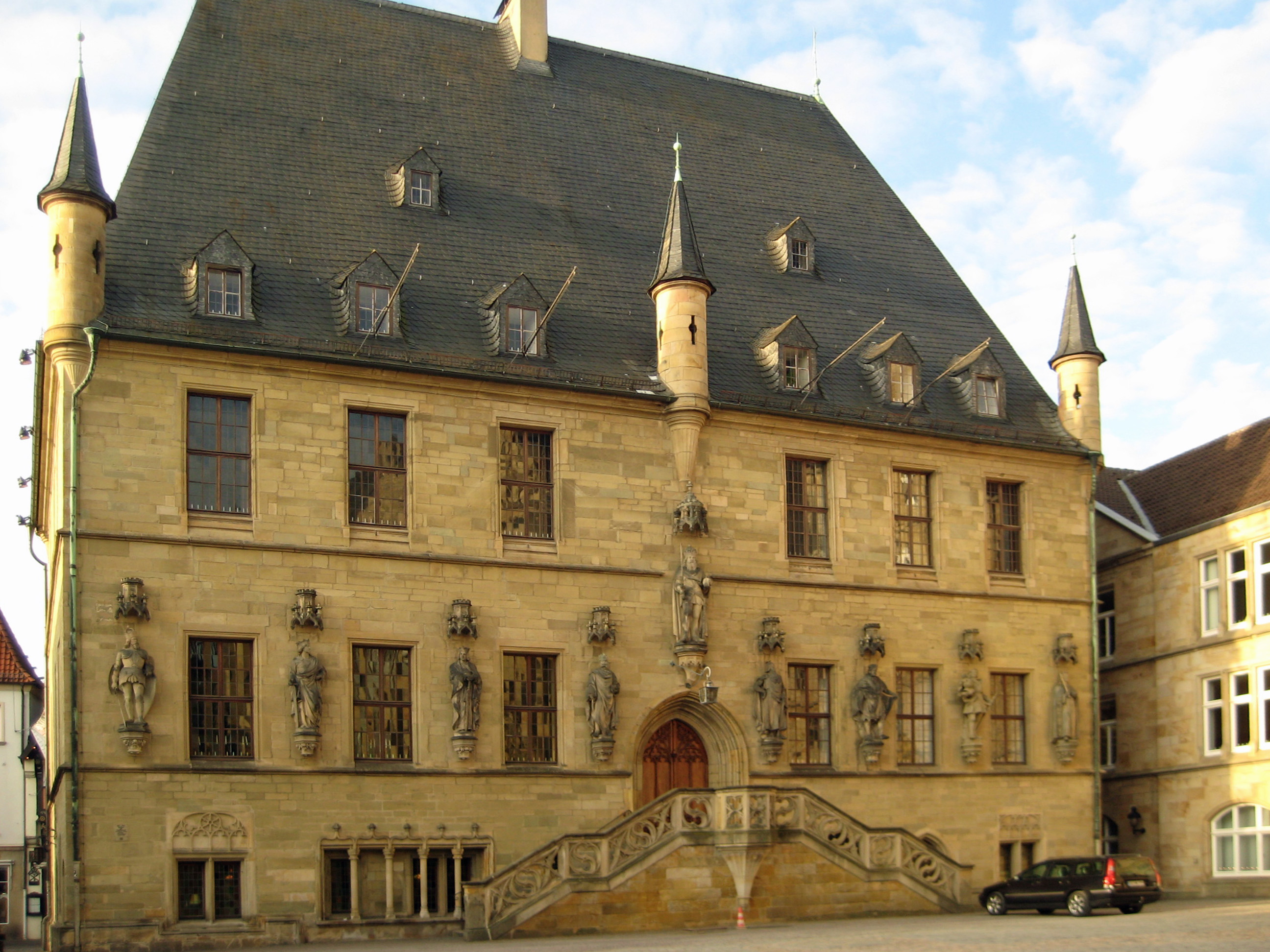
Osnabrück Town Hall (photographed in 2008)

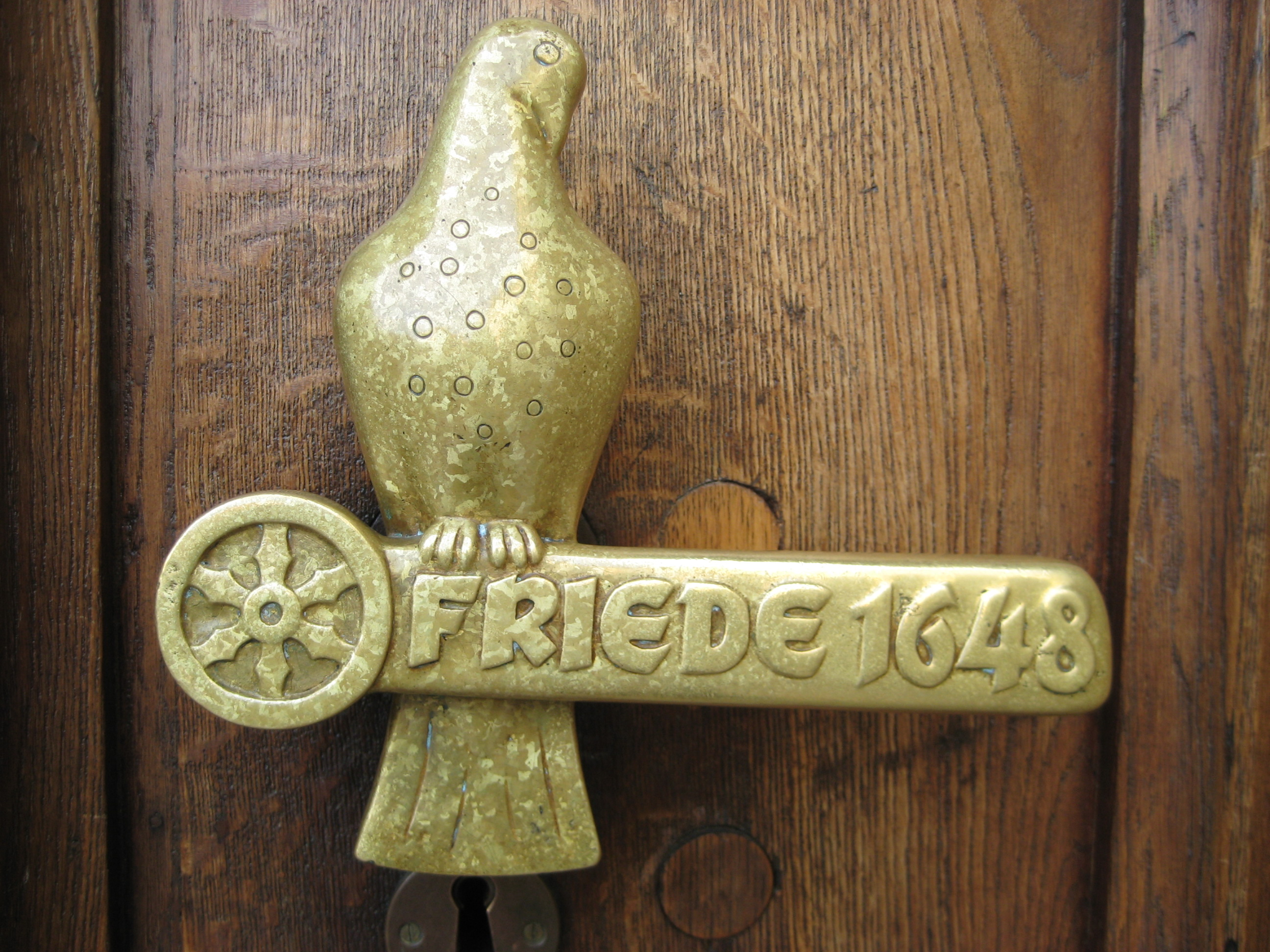
Türgriff Friede 1648 (Doorhandle of Peace 1648) by Fritz Szalinski (1963)

The Town Hall (German: Rathaus) of Osnabrück, Germany, was built in the late Gothic style from 1487 to 1512. It is one of Osnabrück's most important buildings and emblems and continues to be used as the city's town hall today. The Treaty of Westphalia was negotiated and signed by the combatants of the Thirty Years' War at the town halls of Osnabrück and Münster in 1648.

== History ==
Osnabrück's old town hall at the Markt (market place) continued to be used into the 16th century. However, during the previous century, the council of the Hansestadt (Hanseatic city) of Osnabrück had ordered the construction of a new town hall. Construction started in 1487; in 1505 the building was topped out. In 1512 the construction of Osnabrück's new town hall was completed. However, it was not until 1575 when the interior decoration was finally finished.

The final years of the Thirty Years' War were the most significant in the building's history. From 1643 to 1648 part of the delegations sent by the combatants in the Thirty Years' War sat in Osnabrück's town hall to negotiate a peace settlement. The eventual outcome was the "Westfälischer Frieden von Osnabrück und Münster" (Westphalian Peace Treaty of Osnabrück and Münster), signed in 1648. Among those who sat in the town hall of Osnabrück were the envoys representing the Kingdom of Sweden along with those representing the emperor and also the imperial estates; in contrast those representing the emperor and France negotiated simultaneously at the town hall in Münster. Today the negotiations are commemorated by portraits of the 42 European envoys at the Friedenskongress (peace congress), positioned around the walls of the Friedenssaal (Hall of Peace) in the town hall. In addition there are three portraits of the rulers of the main combatant nations: Christina, Queen of Sweden, Louis XIV of France, and German Emperor Ferdinand III.

From 1846 to 1880 the town hall's original Friedenssaal was converted into a so-called "Prunkhalle" (luxury hall). This modification was undone at the start of the 20th century, restoring the Friedenssaal to its original state.

On 13 September 1944 the town hall of Osnabrück was struck numerous times by Allied (especially British) bombs during air raids and severely damaged. The town hall was burned down to its foundation walls. As almost all of the historic furnishings of the town hall had been placed in storage some time earlier on account of the local population's expectation of eventual destruction, the majority of the interior decorations were saved. On 24 October 1948 – just in time for the 300th anniversary celebrations of the Peace of Westphalia – the restored town hall, along with its historic furnishings, was officially reopened for business.

== Structural information ==
The town hall of Osnabrück is built in the late Gothic style. The exterior design of the building makes a considerable impact on the observer. The frontal view is characterised by an 18-metre-high hipped roof, whose height is almost equal to that of the rest of the building from the foundation slab to the eaves. A total of six towers are positioned at the lower end of the roof, reminiscent of watchtowers and corner towers of a fortress. In addition there has been a large flight of steps in front of the town hall since 1846, leading to the roughly 500-year-old entrance door from two sides (previously accessed via a retractable set of wooden steps). The handle of this door is made of heavy bronze and displays the year "1648”; it also features a dove.

A statue of Charlemagne – founder of the city and the Roman Catholic Diocese of Osnabrück – stands above the entrance. Featured alongside him on both sides are the so-called "Kaiser-Plastiken" (emperor sculptures): depicting the German emperors Sigismund, Frederick II (House of Hohenstaufen), Rudolf of Habsburg, Wilhelm I (also King of Prussia), Frederick Barbarossa, Arnulf of Carinthia, Maximilian I and Ludwig the Bavarian. The statues were gifted to the town hall by the Prussian royal family in the 19th century, which explains the presence of the Prussian king and, later, German Emperor Wilhelm I in the row of emperors.

The Friedensaal is located a few metres behind the entrance door to the left; directly opposite is the town hall treasury. A variety of precious items is stored and displayed here, among them the civic silver, coins, embossing stamps and various documents. Particularly noteworthy items are the valuable imperial goblet from the 13th/14th century and Osnabrück's oldest skirmish line. In addition there are documents of historical significance on display, including a replica of the Peace of Westphalia – the "Osnabrücker Friedensinstrument" (Osnabrück Instrument of Peace) – along with a copy of the document with which Emperor Frederick Barbarossa granted the people of Osnabrück the right to exercise their own jurisdiction in 1171.

On the upper floor there is a model of the city of Osnabrück depicting it as it would have looked in 1633. This was based on a city map from that year, produced by the copperplate engraver Wenzel Holler. The model itself was constructed between 1955 and 1957 by sculptor and genre painter Heinrich Bohn (1911-1990).

== Literature ==
- Schreiber, P., Im Rathaus zu Osnabrück (Fromm, Osnabrück, 1975)
- Egenolf, K., 500 Jahre Rathaus Osnabrück: Dokumentation rund um das Festgestehen (City of Osnabrück, Press and Information Office) (Osnabrück, 1990)
