= Onur =

Onur is a common Turkish given name and a surname. In Turkish, "Onur" means "Honour" or Pride. Its origin comes from Latin "honor, honōrem", most resembling the word honneur in French or onore in Italian. Notable people with the name include:

== Given name ==
=== First name ===
- Onur Ağaoğlu (born 1990), Turkish businessman
- Onur Atasayar (born 1995), Turkish football player
- Onur Aydın, multiple people
- Onur Ayık (born 1990), Turkish football player
- Onur Bayramoğlu (born 1990), Turkish football player
- Onur Bulut (born 1994), Turkish football player
- Onur Büyüktopçu (born 1982), Turkish actor
- Onur Cavit Biriz (born 1998), Turkish windsurfer
- Onur Çenik (born 1992), Turkish football player
- Onur Çukur (born 1999), Turkish volleyball player
- Onur Doğan (born 1988), Turkish-born Taiwanese football player
- Onur Ersin (born 1992), Turkish handballer
- Onur Güntürkün (born 1958), Turkish-German neuroscientist
- Onur Karakabak (born 1992), Turkish football player
- Onur Karaman (born 1981), Turkish-born Canadian film director and screenwriter
- Onur Kıvrak (born 1988), Turkish football player
- Onur Kumbaracıbaşı (1939–2022), Turkish politician
- Onur Kurt (born 1992), Turkish volleyball player
- Onur Mutlu (born 1978), Turkish computer scientist and academic
- Onur Öymen (born 1940), Turkish diplomat and politician
- Onur Saylak (born 1977), Turkish actor, filmmaker and director
- Onur Tukel (born 1972), Turkish-American actor, painter, and filmmaker
- Onur Tuna (born 1985), Turkish actor
- Onur Ünlü (born 1973), Turkish film director
- Onur Uras (born 1985), Turkish swimmer
- Onur Seyit Yaran (born 1995), Turkish actor

=== Middle name ===
- Erdem Onur Beytaş (born 1998), Turkish football player

== Fictional characters ==
- Onur, one of the main characters in the Turkish television series Binbir Gece

== Surname ==
- Aras Onur (born 1982), Turkish author
- Aydin Onur (1934–2016), Turkish athlete
- Füsun Onur (born 1938), Turkish artist
- Manolya Onur (1955–2017), Turkish model
- Samed Onur (born 2002), Turkish football player
