= Ağaoğlu =

Ağaoğlu is a Turkish surname. People with the surname include:

- Adalet Ağaoğlu (1929–2020), Turkish novelist
- Ahmet Ağaoğlu (1869–1939), Azerbaijani and Turkish publicist and journalist
- Ali Ağaoğlu (born 1954), Turkish businessman
- Burak Ağaoğlu (born 1999), Turkish football player
- Onur Ağaoğlu (born 1990), Turkish architect and author
- Samet Ağaoğlu (1909–1982), Turkish politician
- Süreyya Ağaoğlu (1903–1989), Turkish writer
- Yeşim Ağaoğlu (born 1966), Turkish artist
