= Yeşim =

Yeşim is a feminine Turkish given name and means "Jade" in the Turkish language.

== People ==
=== Given name ===
- Yeşim Ağaoğlu (born 1966), Turkish multidisciplinary artist and poet
- Yeşim Bostan (born 1995), Turkish archer
- Yeşim Büber (born 1977), Turkish actress
- Yeşim Demirel (born 1990), Turkish-German footballer
- Yeşim Salkım (born 1968), Turkish singer and actress
- Yeşim Tozan (born 1975), Turkish actress
- Yeşim Ustaoğlu (born 1960), Turkish filmmaker and screenwriter
