= Schinkel (Osnabrück district) =

District of Osnabrück, Lower Saxony, Germany

Coordinates: 52.2792°N 8.0806°E

Schinkel is a district of Osnabrück, Germany, first mentioned in records in 1332. It is situated in the east of the city, into which it was incorporated on 1 April 1914. There are roughly 13,300 people in Schinkel.

The name Schinkel is possibly a reference to the flank-like (Schenkel) form of the Schinkelberg (Schinkel Hill); however the exact meaning and origin of the name are unknown. Contrary to some claims it is unlikely that the district was named after the Prussian builder Karl Friedrich Schinkel. Colloquially and among local residents, the district tends to be referred to as “der” (the) Schinkel.

== Geography ==
The Schinkel district's original boundaries originally encompassed today's districts of Schinkel, Schinkel-Ost, Widukindland, the southern part of Dodesheide, the western part of Darum/Gretesch/Lüstringen and the north-west corner of Voxtrup; in the city of Osnabrück districts were not arranged based on the boundaries of former areas or communities.

Next to the district of Schinkel there is also the district of Schinkel-Ost, which is home to about 3,500 people. The district of Gartlage is also commonly regarded as being part of Schinkel, even though it never actually lay within Schinkel's boundaries.

== Infrastructure ==
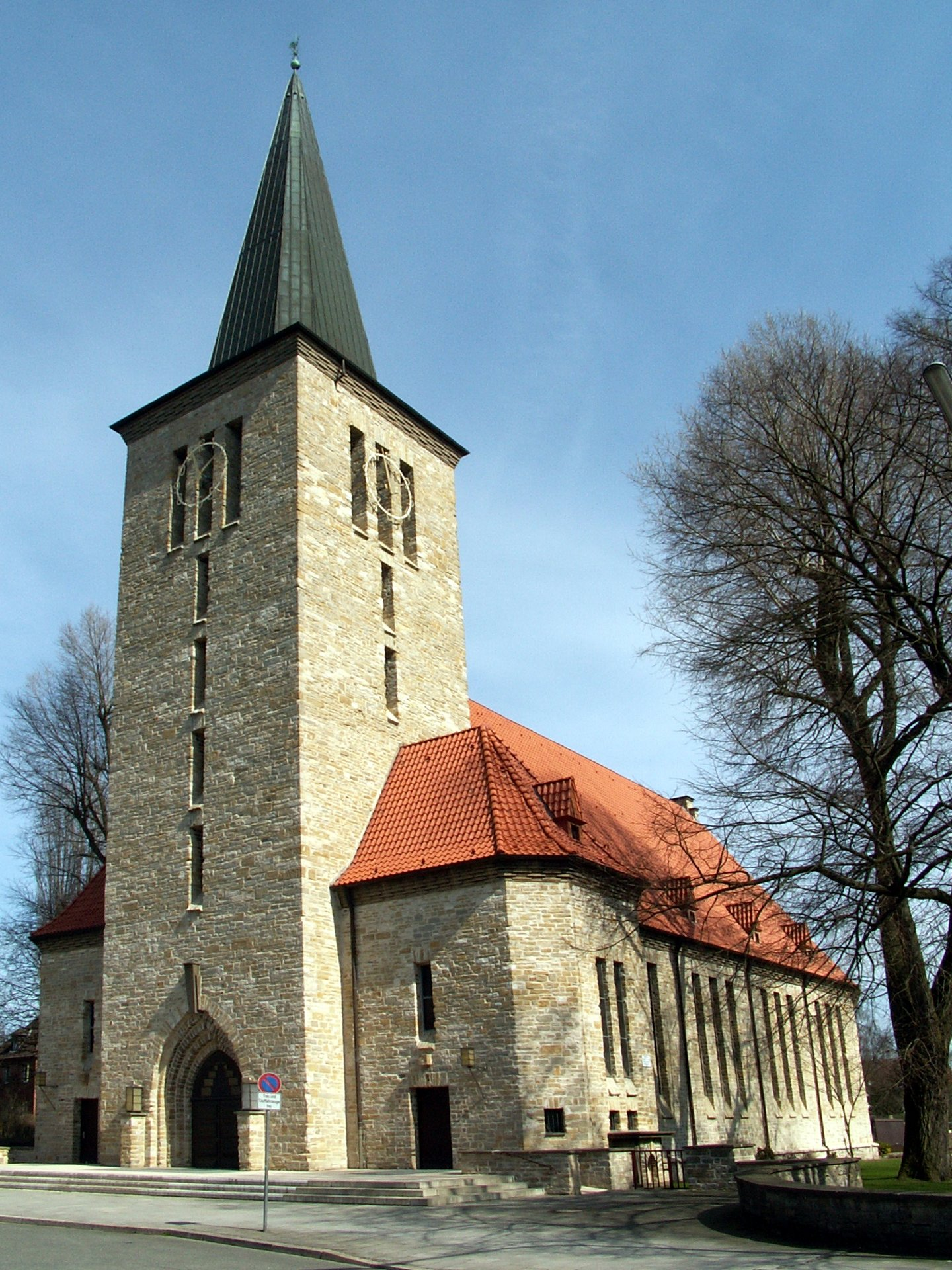
Pauluskirche (St. Paul's Church)

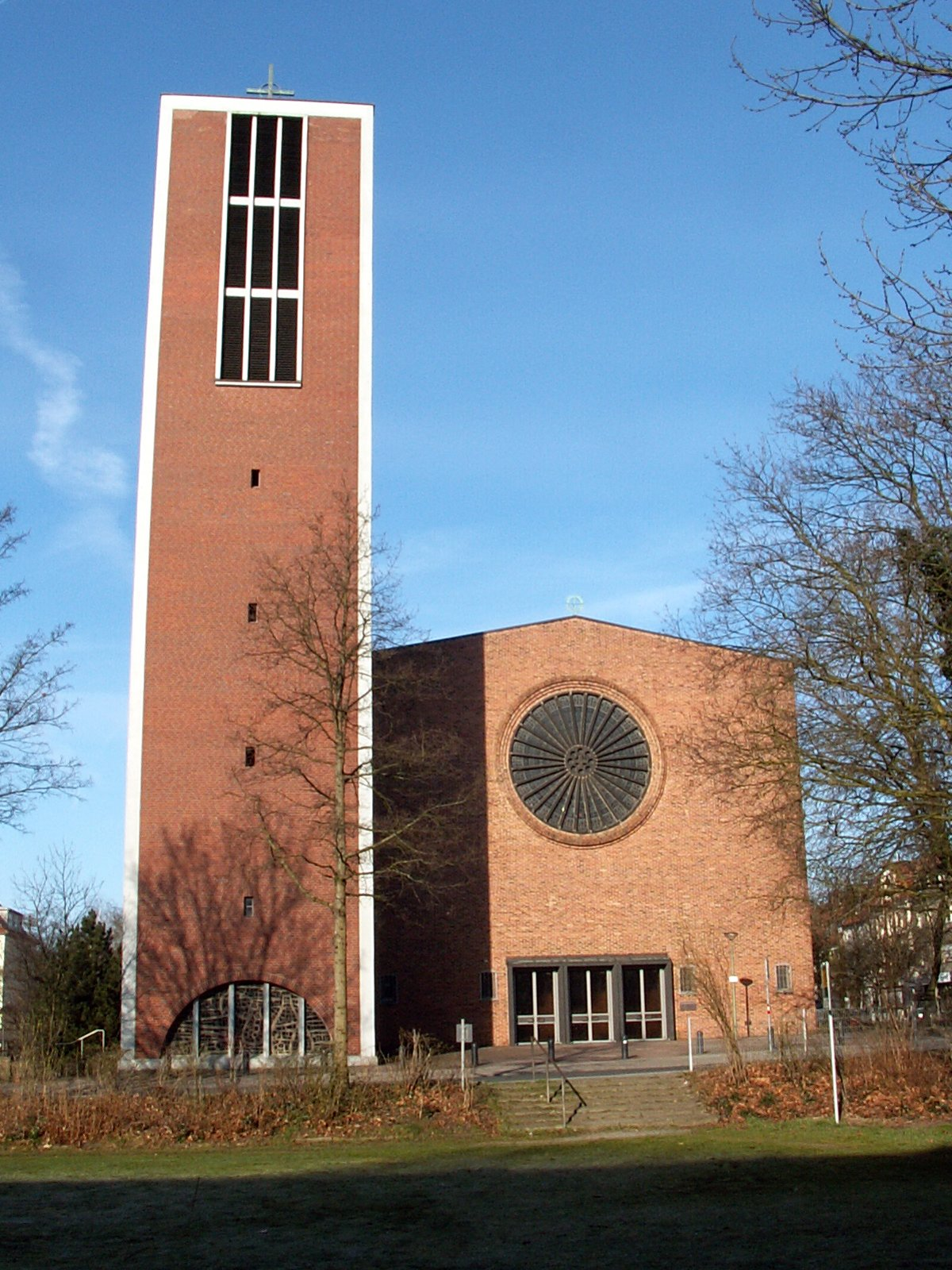
Heilig-Kreuz-Kirche (Church of the Holy Cross)

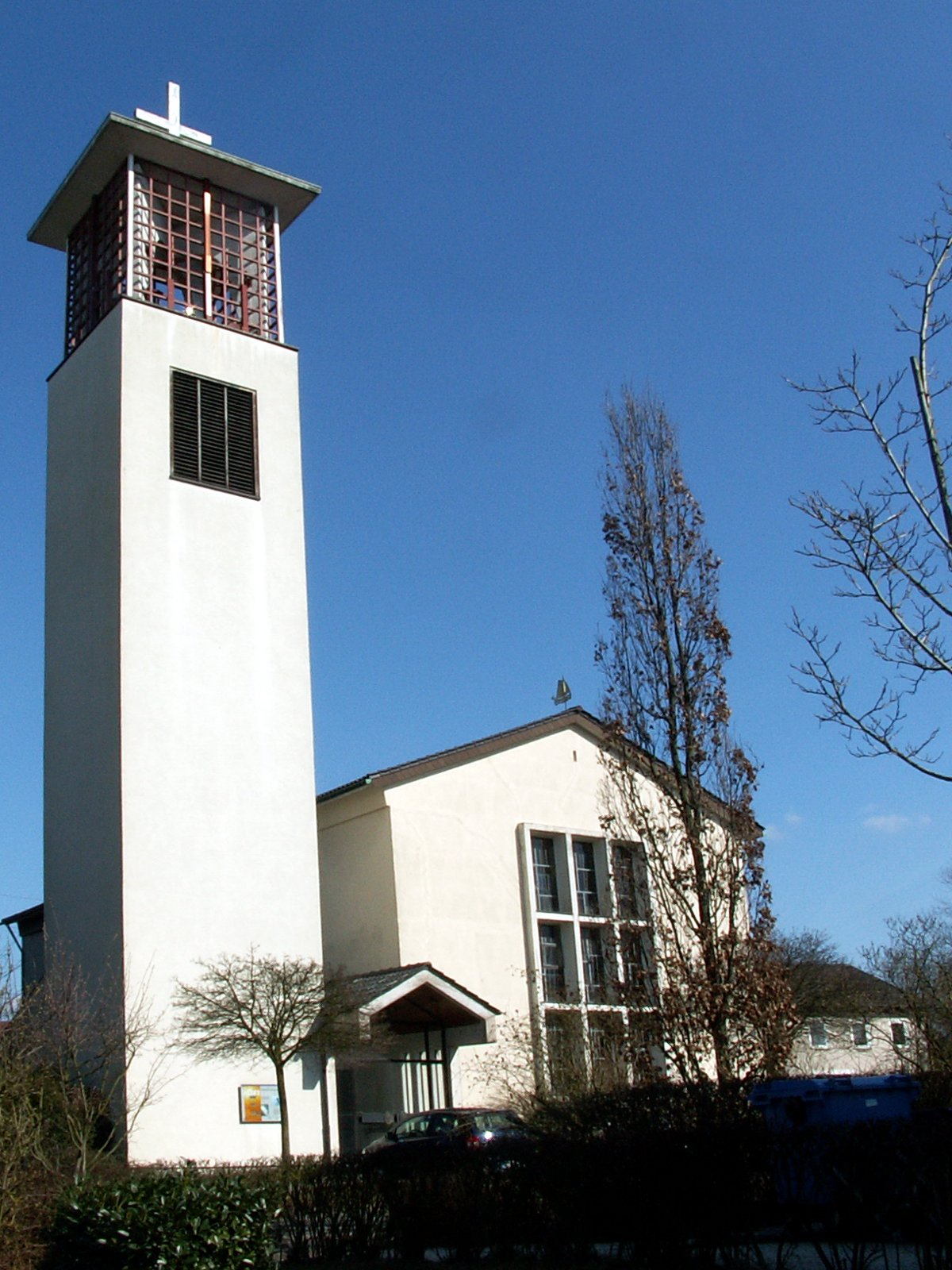
Gnadenkirche (Church of Mercy)

During World War II most of the residential houses in Osnabrück were destroyed in air raids. The first attack on the Schinkel area, on 23 June 1940, was directed at the Osnabrücker Kupfer- und Drahtwerk (Osnabrück Copper and Wire Works, abbreviated OKD, today KM Europa Metal) – by the time the war finished in May 1945, 65% of it had been destroyed.

Today's Schinkel is characterized by its integration of numerous nationalities. The district is home to numerous primary schools and kindergartens; however the local library had to close in 2010 due to the city's troubled economic situation. The district is also popular among older citizens. Around the Schützenstraße area lies the beating heart of Schinkel: numerous shops, pharmacies, doctors and bank branches. Every Wednesday there is a Wochenmarkt (weekly market) on Ebertallee, located between the Heilig-Kreuz-Kirche and the Pauluskirche. On Buerschen Straße there are several new facilities for senior citizens as well as the “Junger Schinkel” (Young Schinkel) project. A residential area with terraced houses has encouraged many families to live in Schinkel. Sports clubs (such as VfL Osnabrück, SC Türkgücü, VfB Schinkel, Blau-Weiß Schinkel, Sportfreunde Schinkel-Ost), a citizens’ association, numerous choirs and a convivial atmosphere also define this district's character. Its spacious indoor swimming pool – the Schinkelbad – attracts many visitors. Schinkel is also the location of the osnatel-Arena, located by the Bremer bridge – the stadium of VfL Osnabrück.

Schinkel is the home of the 1. Osnabrücker Nachbarschaftsverein (First Neighbourhood Association).

There are also two Evangelical/Protestant churches – the Pauluskirche and the Jakobuskirche (Jacobus Church) – two Catholic churches – the Heilig-Kreuz-Kirche and the St. Maria Rosenkranzkirche (St. Mary's Rosary Church) – and two mosques (Fatih Camii and Takwa). The Reformed Protestant Gnadenkirche (Church of Mercy), built in 1960, was completely pulled down apart from its bell tower due to financial difficulties, to make way for a day care centre for children.

The Schinkelberg and Gartlage are two green belts, which offer their residents particularly good opportunities for recreation. Two bunkers are situated on Oststraße – the Ostbunker and a round bunker on the site of the railway repair works. It is colloquially referred to as “Otto Bunker”; this name is even visible on the bunker itself.

The railway depot in Schinkel, which was established in 1876, was in earlier times colloquially referred to as “Kamerun” (Cameroon). The depot was demolished in April 2009; since then a discount food and clothing store has been built on the site. Schinkel is a district rich in tradition, with developed residential and business infrastructure. Its roots stretch back to the 19th century. Leasers and traders live and work here – some have done for generations. This cultural image is more pronounced here than in any other district of Osnabrück.

== Personalities ==
The pastor Richard Karwehl was active in the evangelical Pauluskirche during the period of Nazi rule – having taken up opposition to National Socialism due to his Christian convictions, he was also an active figure in the Confessing Church. The square in front of the church is named after him (Richard-Karwehl-Platz).

The journalist and author Harald Wehmeier (born 1953) was born in Schinkel.

== Transportation ==
Osnabrück's tram line 3 operated in Schinkel until 1958, running from the terminus station “Schinkel” on the corner between Schützenstraße and Bremer Straße and passing through Schützenstraße and Buersche Straße towards Neumarkt-Martiniplatz (today Heinrich-Lübke-Platz, named after Germany's second Federal President) in the Weststadt district.

Today the district is served by bus lines 11/12/13, 71/72, 91/92 – each running every ten minutes – connecting it to the nearby Innenstadt (city centre) and surrounding districts.

The construction of a regional train station in the Bremer Brücke/Halle Gartlage area is being considered – earlier a platform for special trips was situated here. The police have given support to this idea in the citizens’ forum, with regards to football matches and visitors to the stadium.
