= List of football stadiums in Germany =

The following is a list of football stadiums in Germany with a total capacity of at least 20,000 spectators (seating and standing). Below a list of stadiums with a capacity of at least 10,000. Stadiums in bold are part of the 2026–27 Bundesliga.

== Current stadiums ==
=== Capacity above 20,000 ===
#	Image	Stadium	Capacity	City	State	Home team	Opened	UEFA rank
1		**Signal Iduna Park** (Westfalenstadion)	81,365	Dortmund	North Rhine-Westphalia	Borussia Dortmund	1974	4/4 stars
2		**Allianz Arena** (Munich Football Arena)	75,024	Munich	Bavaria	Bayern Munich	2005	4/4 stars
3		Olympiastadion Berlin	74,475	Berlin	Berlin	Hertha BSC	1936	4/4 stars
4		Olympiastadion Munich	63,118	Munich	Bavaria		1972	
5		**Veltins-Arena** (Arena AufSchalke)	62,271	Gelsenkirchen	North Rhine-Westphalia	Schalke 04	2001	4/4 stars
6		**MHPArena** (Neckarstadion)	60,058	Stuttgart	Baden-Württemberg	VfB Stuttgart	1933	4/4 stars
7		**Deutsche Bank Park** (Waldstadion)	59,500	Frankfurt	Hesse	Eintracht Frankfurt	1925	4/4 stars
8		**Volksparkstadion**	57,000	Hamburg	Hamburg	Hamburger SV	1953	4/4 stars
9		Merkur Spiel-Arena (Düsseldorf Arena)	54,600	Düsseldorf	North Rhine-Westphalia	Fortuna Düsseldorf	2005	4/4 stars
10		**Borussia-Park**	54,022	Mönchengladbach	North Rhine-Westphalia	Borussia Mönchengladbach	2004	4/4 stars
11		Max-Morlock-Stadion	50,000	Nuremberg	Bavaria	1. FC Nürnberg	1928	
12		**RheinEnergieStadion** (Müngersdorfer Stadion)	49,698	Cologne	North Rhine-Westphalia	1. FC Köln	1923	4/4 stars
13		Fritz-Walter-Stadion	49,327	Kaiserslautern	Rhineland-Palatinate	1. FC Kaiserslautern	1920	4/4 stars
14		Heinz-von-Heiden-Arena (Niedersachsenstadion)	49,000	Hannover	Lower Saxony	Hannover 96	1954	4/4 stars
15		**Red Bull Arena** (Zentralstadion)	47,800	Leipzig	Saxony	RB Leipzig	2004	4/4 stars
16		**Weserstadion**	42,100	Bremen	Bremen	Werder Bremen	1947	4/4 stars
17		**Europa-Park Stadion**	34,700	Freiburg im Breisgau	Baden-Württemberg	SC Freiburg	2021	4/4 stars
18		BBBank Wildpark (Wildparkstadion)	34,140	Karlsruhe	Baden-Württemberg	Karlsruher SC	2023	
19		**Mewa Arena**	34,034	Mainz	Rhineland-Palatinate	Mainz 05	2011	4/4 stars
20		Tivoli	32,960	Aachen	North Rhine-Westphalia	Alemannia Aachen	2009	
21		Rosenaustadion	32,354	Augsburg	Bavaria	FC Augsburg II	1951	
22		Rudolf-Harbig-Stadion	32,066	Dresden	Saxony	Dynamo Dresden	1923	
23		Schauinsland-Reisen-Arena (MSV-Arena)	31,514	Duisburg	North Rhine-Westphalia	MSV Duisburg	2004	
24		**WWK Arena** (Augsburg Arena)	30,660	Augsburg	Bavaria	FC Augsburg	2009	
25		**BayArena**	30,210	Leverkusen	North Rhine-Westphalia	Bayer Leverkusen	1958	
26		**PreZero Arena** (Rhein-Neckar-Arena)	30,150	Sinsheim	Baden-Württemberg	TSG Hoffenheim	2009	
27		Avnet Arena	30,098	Magdeburg	Saxony-Anhalt	1. FC Magdeburg	2006	
28		Volkswagen Arena	30,000	Wolfsburg	Lower Saxony	VfL Wolfsburg	2002	
29		Millerntor-Stadion	29,546	Hamburg	Hamburg	FC St. Pauli	1963	
30		Ostseestadion	29,000	Rostock	Mecklenburg-Vorpommern	Hansa Rostock	1954	
31		Vonovia Ruhrstadion	27,599	Bochum	North Rhine-Westphalia	VfL Bochum	1911	
32		SchücoArena (Bielefelder Alm)	27,300	Bielefeld	North Rhine-Westphalia	Arminia Bielefeld	1926	
33		Carl-Benz-Stadion	26,022	Mannheim	Baden-Württemberg	Waldhof Mannheim	1994	
34		Dreisamstadion	24,000	Freiburg im Breisgau	Baden-Württemberg	SC Freiburg II	1953	
35		Ellenfeldstadion	23,400	Neunkirchen	Saarland	Borussia Neunkirchen	1912	
36		Eintracht-Stadion	23,325	Braunschweig	Lower Saxony	Eintracht Braunschweig	1923	
37		Stadion am Zoo	23,067	Wuppertal	North Rhine-Westphalia	Wuppertaler SV	1924	
38		Stadion der Freundschaft	22,528	Cottbus	Brandenburg	Energie Cottbus	1930	
39		**Stadion An der Alten Försterei**	22,012	Berlin	Berlin	Union Berlin	1966	
40		Hans-Walter-Wild-Stadion	21,500	Bayreuth	Bavaria	SpVgg Bayreuth	1967	
41		Niederrheinstadion	21,318	Oberhausen	North Rhine-Westphalia	Rot-Weiß Oberhausen	1926	
42		Stadion an der Hafenstraße	20,650	Essen	North Rhine-Westphalia	Rot-Weiss Essen	2012	
43		Stadion am Bieberer Berg	20,500	Offenbach am Main	Hesse	Kickers Offenbach	2012	
44		Grotenburg-Stadion	20,200	Krefeld	North Rhine-Westphalia	KFC Uerdingen 05	1927	

=== Capacity of 10,000–20,000 ===
#	Image	Stadium	Capacity	City	State	Home team	Opened	Notes
1		Paul-Greifzu-Stadion	20,000	Dessau-Roßlau	Saxony-Anhalt	SV Dessau 05	1952	
2		Friedrich-Ludwig-Jahn-Stadion	19,708	Berlin	Berlin		1952	Demolition began in 2024.
3		Donaustadion	19,500	Ulm	Baden-Württemberg	SSV Ulm	1925	
4		Merck-Stadion am Böllenfalltor	17,810	Darmstadt	Hesse	Darmstadt 98	1921	
5		Stadion an der Bremer Brücke	16,667	Osnabrück	Lower Saxony	VfL Osnabrück	1933	
6		Sportpark Ronhof | Thomas Sommer	16,626	Fürth	Bavaria	Greuther Fürth	1910	
7		Ischelandstadion	16,500	Hagen	North Rhine-Westphalia	SSV Hagen		
8		Ludwigsparkstadion	16,003	Saarbrücken	Saarland	1. FC Saarbrücken		
9		Erzgebirgsstadion	15,711	Aue-Bad Schlema	Saxony	Erzgebirge Aue		
10		GP Stadion am Hardtwald (Hardtwaldstadion)	15,414	Sandhausen	Baden-Württemberg	SV Sandhausen		
11		Jahnstadion Regensburg	15,210	Regensburg	Bavaria	Jahn Regensburg	2015	
12		Leuna-Chemie-Stadion	15,057	Halle	Saxony-Anhalt	Hallescher FC		
13		Uhlsport Park (Sportpark Unterhaching)	15,053	Unterhaching	Bavaria	SpVgg Unterhaching, Munich Ravens	1992	
14		Holstein-Stadion	15,034	Kiel	Schleswig-Holstein	Holstein Kiel		
15		Voith-Arena	15,001	Heidenheim	Baden-Württemberg	1. FC Heidenheim		
16		ad hoc arena	15,000	Jena	Thuringia	Carl Zeiss Jena		
17		Grünwalder Stadion	15,000	Munich	Bavaria	1860 Munich, Bayern Munich II	1911	
18		**Home Deluxe Arena**	15,000	Paderborn	North Rhine-Westphalia	SC Paderborn		
19		Audi Sportpark	15,000	Ingolstadt	Bavaria	FC Ingolstadt	2010	
20		Hänsch-Arena	13,241	Meppen	Lower Saxony	SV Meppen		
21		BRITA-Arena	12,566	Wiesbaden	Hesse	Wehen Wiesbaden		
22		PSD Bank Arena (Stadion am Bornheimer Hang)	12,542	Frankfurt	Hesse	FSV Frankfurt, Frankfurt Galaxy, Frankfurt Universe		
23		Südstadion	11,748	Cologne	North Rhine-Westphalia	Fortuna Köln, Cologne Centurions		
24		Gazi-Stadion auf der Waldau	11,468	Stuttgart	Baden-Württemberg	Stuttgarter Kickers, Stuttgart Scorpions, Stuttgart Surge		
25		Sportpark Nord	10,164	Bonn	North Rhine-Westphalia	Bonner SC		
26		GGZ-Arena (Stadion Zwickau)	10,049	Zwickau	Saxony	FSV Zwickau		
27		WIRmachenDRUCK Arena	10,001	Aspach	Baden-Württemberg	Sonnenhof Großaspach, VfB Stuttgart II		
28		Sportpark Höhenberg	10,001	Cologne	North Rhine-Westphalia	Viktoria Köln		
29		**Waldstadion an der Kaiserlinde**	10,000	Spiesen-Elversberg	Saarland	SV Elversberg		

== See also ==
- List of indoor arenas in Germany
- List of European stadiums by capacity
- List of association football stadiums by capacity
- List of association football stadiums by country
- List of sports venues by capacity
- Lists of stadiums
