= Onurcan =

Onurcan is a Turkish given name. In Turkish, "Onur" means "honour" or "pride". Its origin comes from the French word "honneur". "Can" means "spirit, life, soul or heart".

Onurcan may refer to:

== Given name ==
- Onurcan Çakır (born 1995), Turkish male volleyball player
- Onurcan Güler (born 1995), Turkish professional footballer
- Onurcan Piri (born 1994), Turkish professional footballer
