= Adana Toros BYZ =

Volleyball club based in Adana, Turkey

- Full name: Adana Toros BYZ Voleybol Kulübü
- Short name: Adana Toros
- Founded: 2011
- Ground: Menderes Sports Hall (Capacity: 2000)
- Chairman: Ertuğrul Doğaner
- Manager: Aykut Lale
- Captain: Rıdvan Karataş
- League: Turkish Men's Volleyball First League
- 2015/16: Turkish Men's Volleyball Second League Champion

Adana Toros BYZ is a volleyball club based in Adana. Club's men's team promoted to the top flight of the Turkish Men's Volleyball League in 2016, in just 5 years after the foundation. The club play their home games at the Menderes Sports Hall and is sponsored by Tatlıcı Köse, Sera Fresh, Bodyline and Anadolu Bal. Jersey colours are blue and navy.

== History ==
Adana Toros was founded in 2011 in Adana, as 'Adana Beyzaspor'. The club promoted to the 3rd League of the Turkish Volleyball immediately, and at the 2013/14 season, the club promoted to the 2nd League. At the mean time, the club got its new name Adana BYZ Algomed. In 2015, the club name has changed to Adana Toros BYZ.

=== Previous names ===
- Adana Beyzaspor (2011-2014)
- Adana BYZ Algomed (2014–2015)
- Adana Toros BYZ (2015–present)

== Board of directors ==
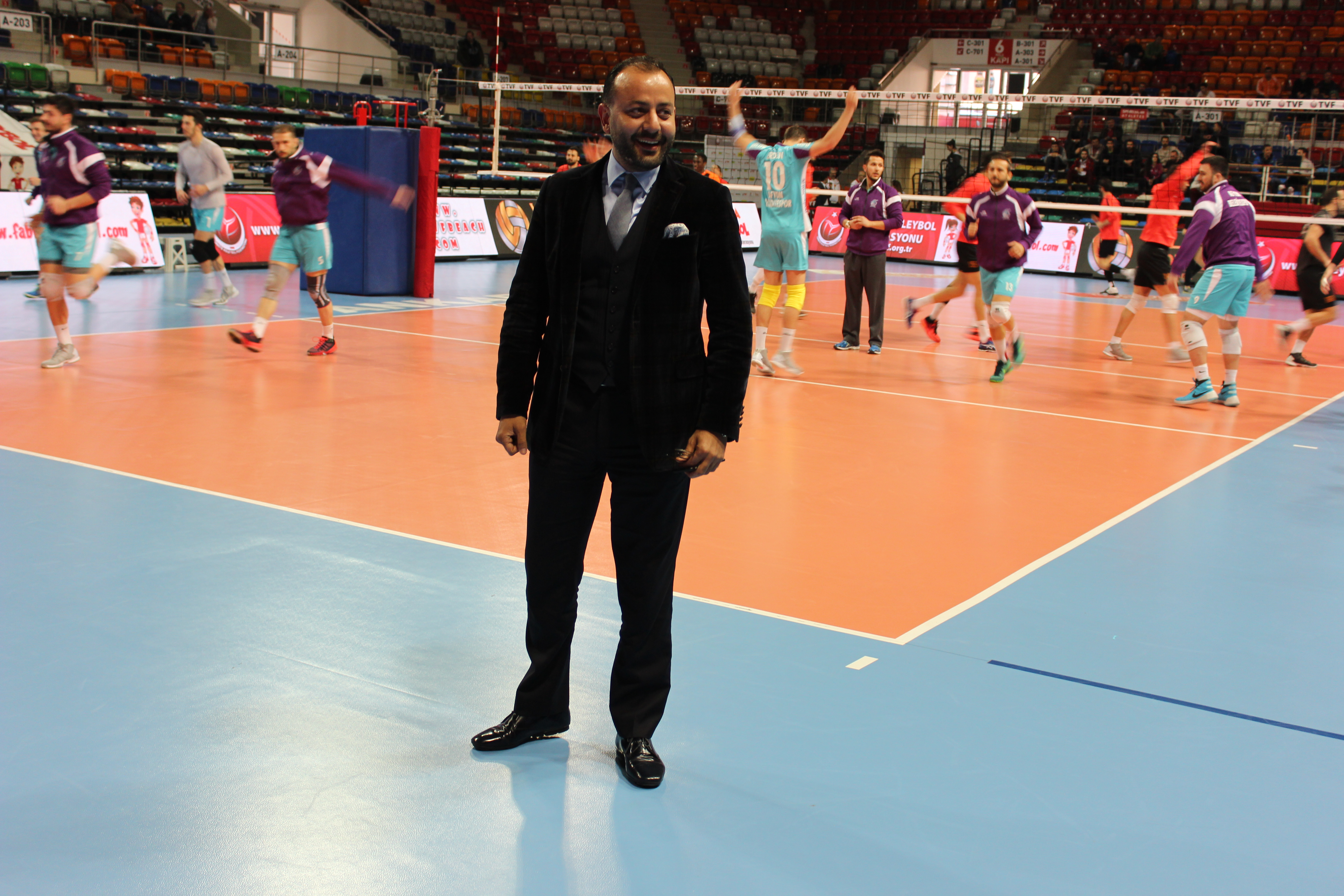
Ertuğrul Doğaner

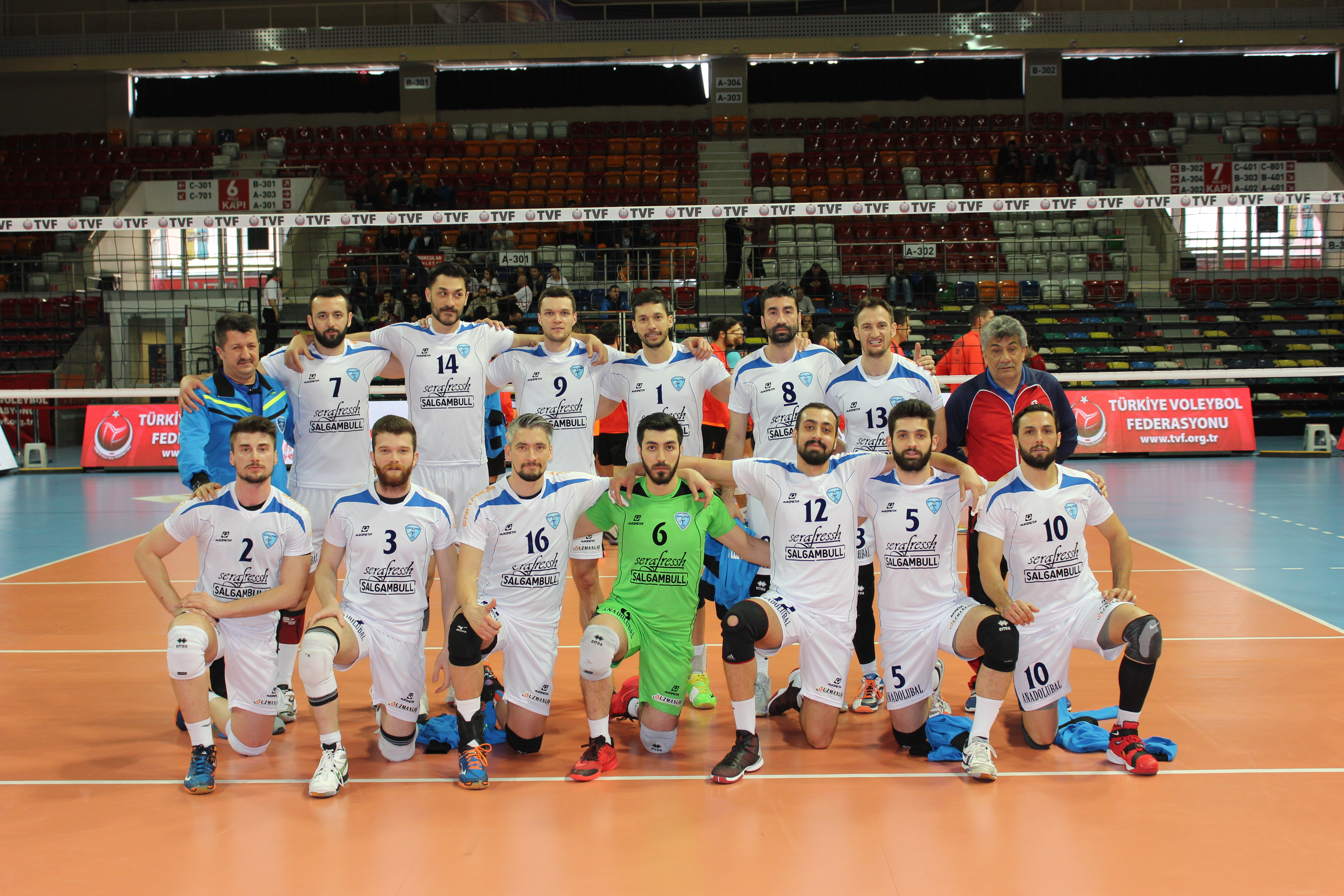
Team 2015/16

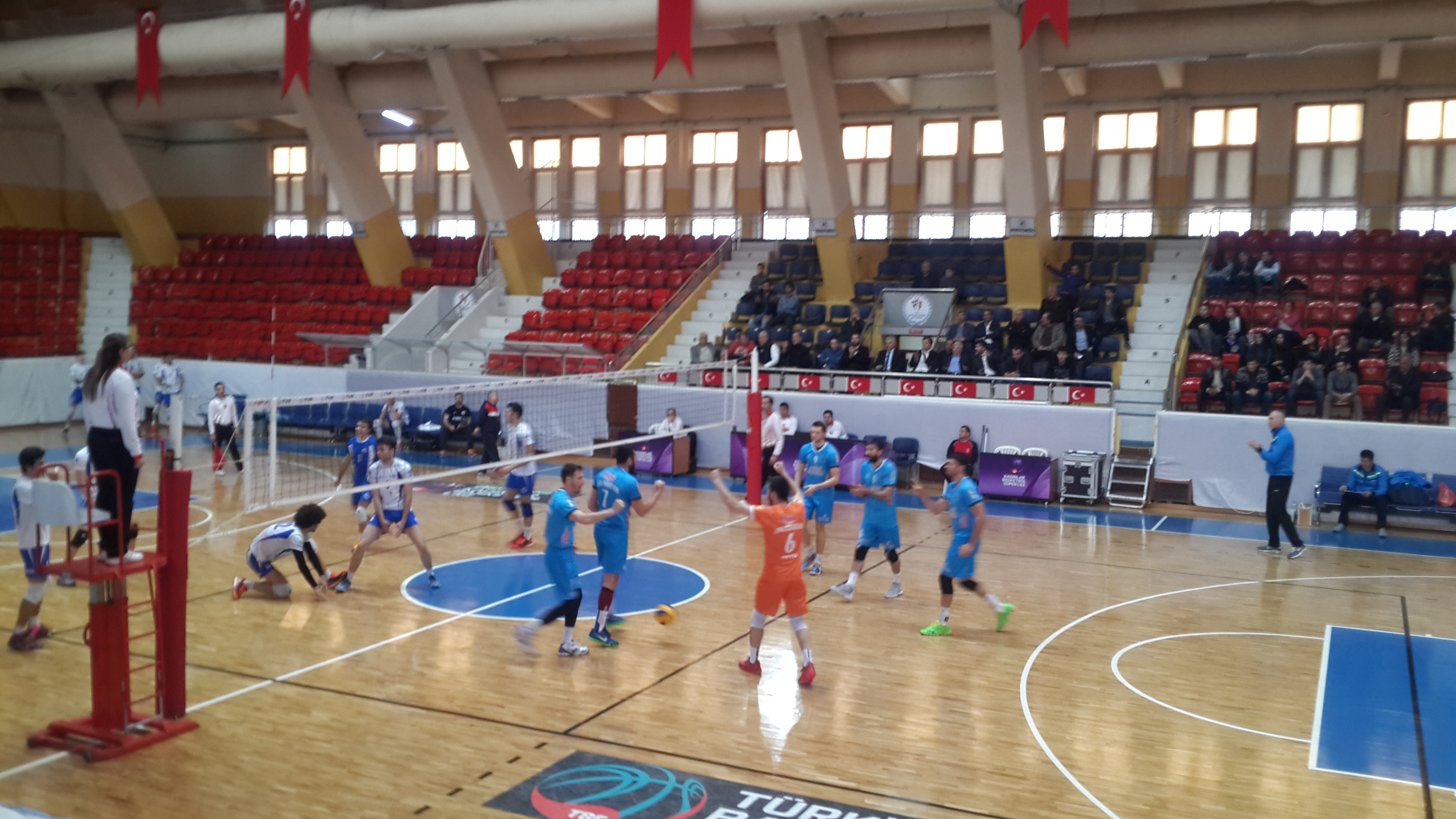
During a home game

Name	Task
(Turkey) İmam Gazali Hıradağı	Honorary President
(Turkey) Ertuğrul Doğaner	President
(Turkey) Veli Karahan	Vice-President
(Turkey) Kazım Bozan	Vice-President
(Turkey) Ömer Bozdoğan	Sports Director
(Turkey) Zübeyit Şendur	Board Member
(Turkey) Demet Ertem	Board Member
(Turkey) Murat Tanır	Board Member
(Turkey) Hasan Özkan	Press Secretary

== Volleyball in 2015/16 ==
Adana Toros started the season with 14 new players, including the Austrian national player Thomas Zass. The team finished the group stage at the top with 23 wins in 25 games, losing only 10 sets in total. At semi-final play-off stage in Ankara, the team won all the three games without losing a set.

Play-off finals are played in Bursa, on April 11–13. After beating Düzce Belediyesi and Gümüşhane Torul, Adana Toros guaranteed to promote to the Turkish Men's Volleyball League.

=== Current squad ===
Squad as of April 7, 2016

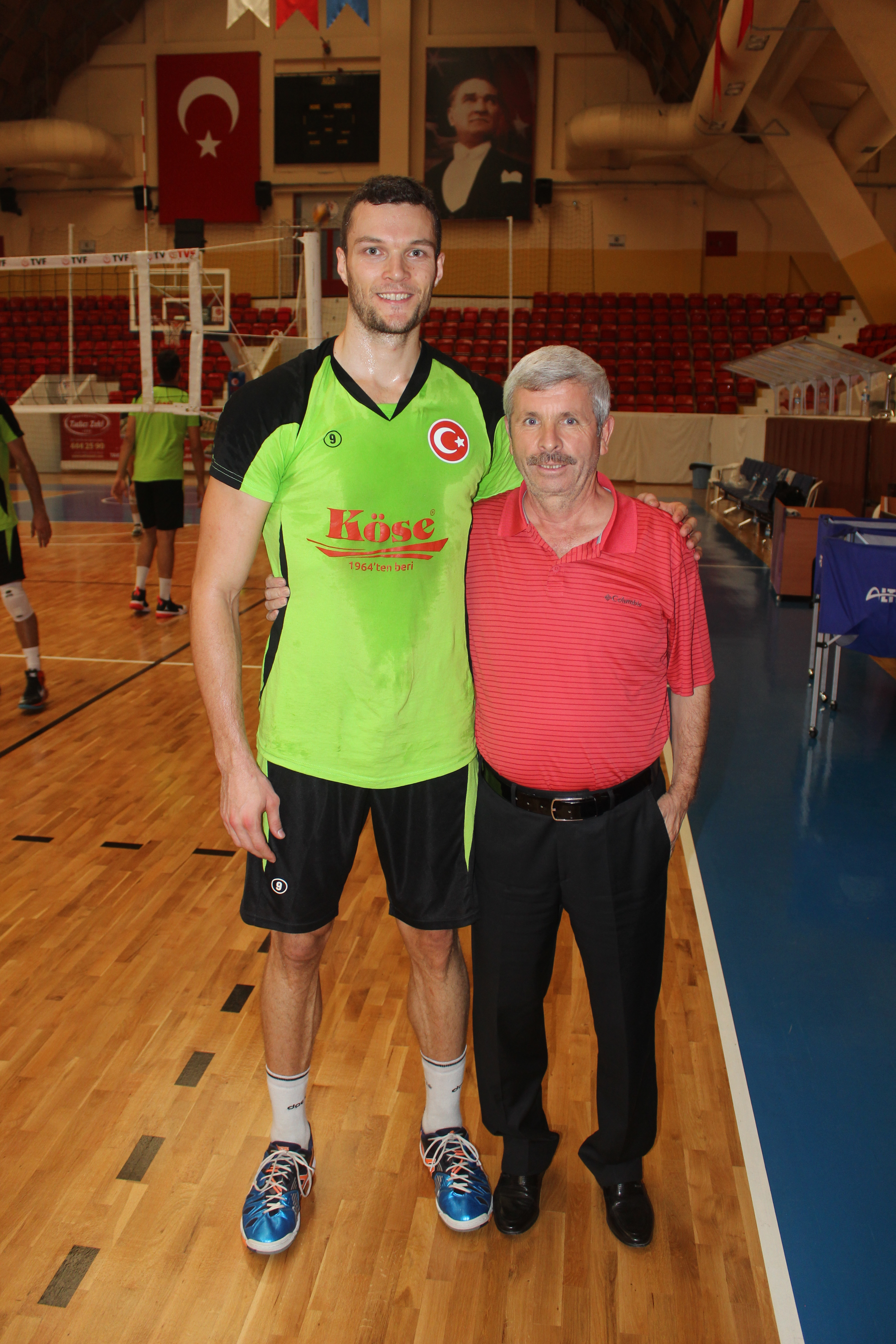
Zass joined the club with the support of Tatlıcı Köse

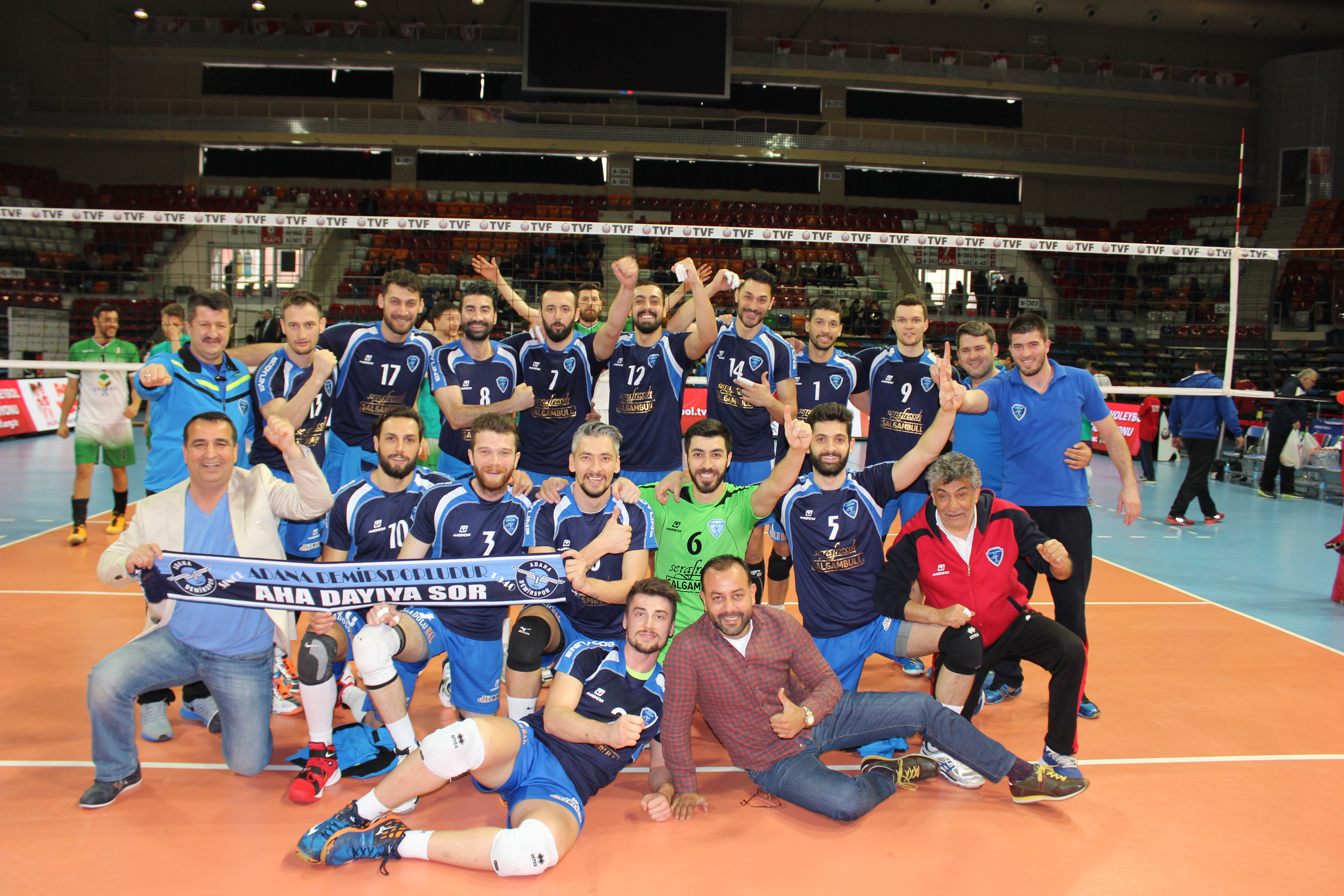
Cheers after a win

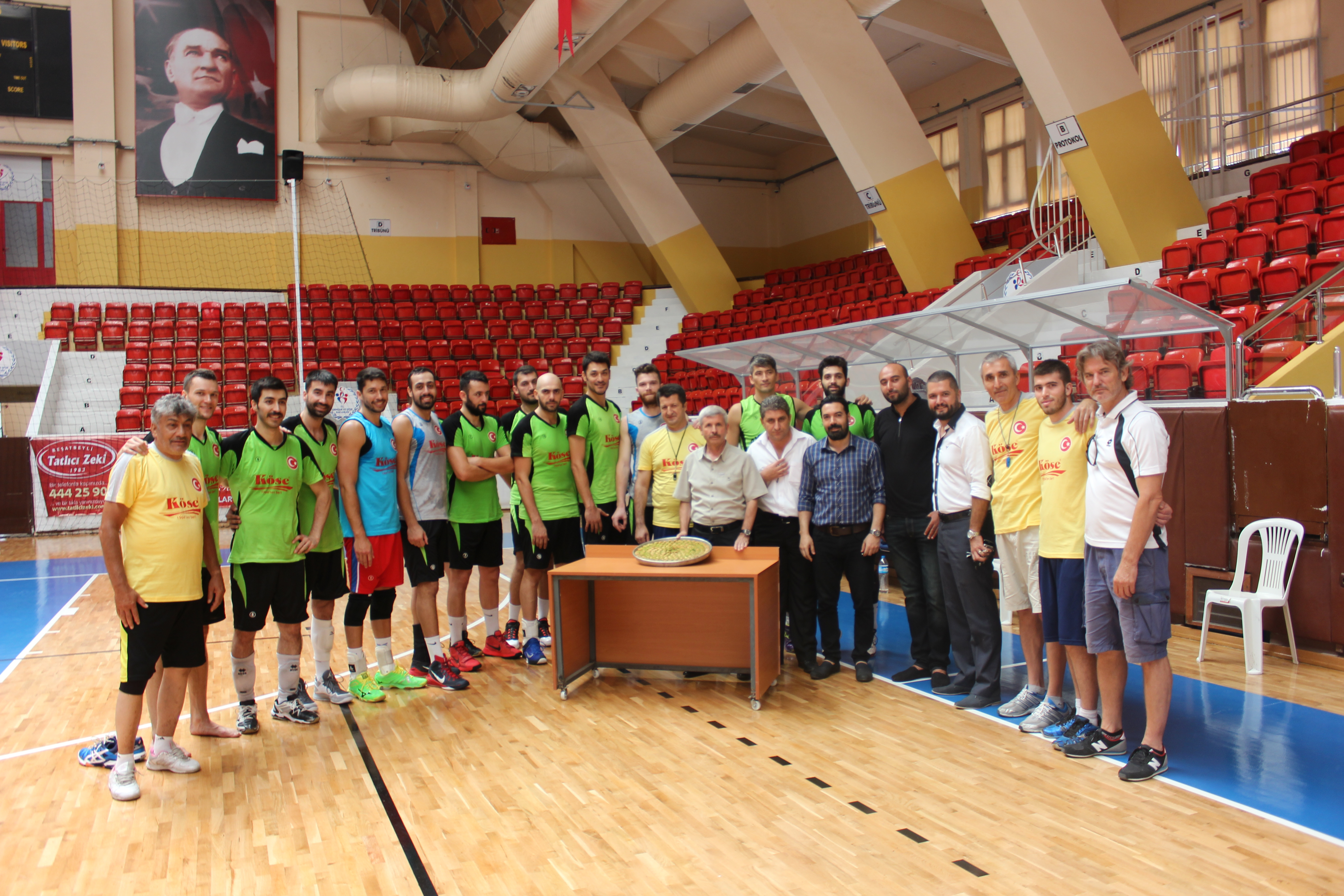
Baklava treat during training

Number	Player	Position	Height (m)
1	(Brazil) Ashlei Nemer	Outside hitter	1.92
2	(Turkey) Murat Yenipazar	Setter	1.94
3	(Turkey) Mert Tetik	Outside hitter	1.90
5	(Turkey) Sercan Cihangir	Setter	1.90
6	(Turkey) Metin Durmuş	Libero	1.87
7	(Turkey) Umut Yücel Baran	Middle blocker	1.96
8	(Turkey) Rıdvan Karataş	Setter	1.92
9	(Austria) Thomas Zass	Opposite	1.93
10	(Turkey) Engin Özbek	Outside hitter	1.90
12	(Turkey) Onur Kurt	Middle blocker	1.95
13	(Turkey) Turgay Doğan	Outside hitter	1.90
14	(Turkey) Fatih Barış	Middle blocker	2.04
16	(Turkey) Caner Demirci	Outside hitter	1.95
17	(Turkey) Murat Palavar	Middle blocker	2.05

=== Technical staff ===
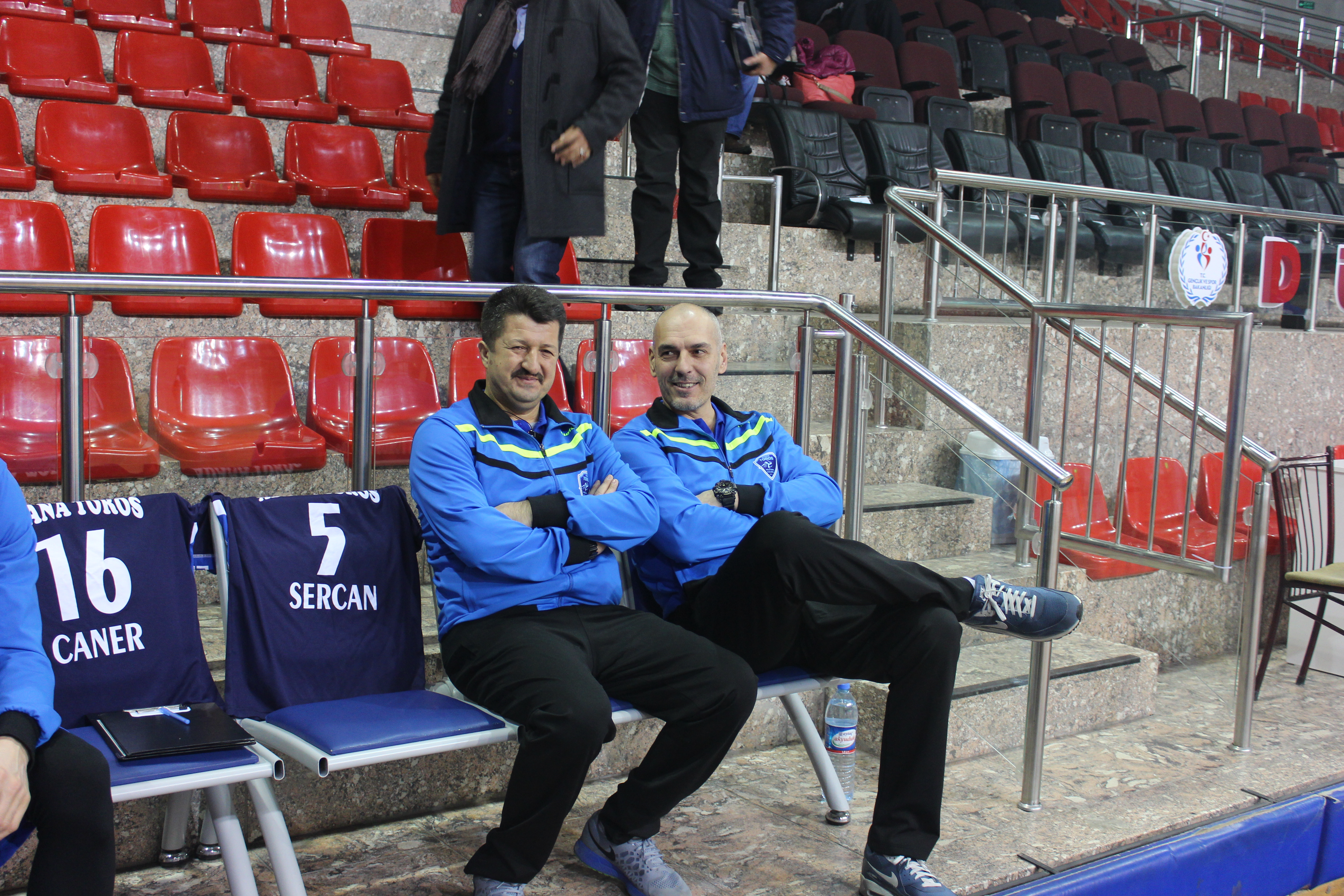
Ömer Bozdoğan and Aykut Lale

Name	Job
(Turkey) Aykut Lale	Head coach
(Turkey) Ömer Bozdoğan	Assistant coach
(Turkey) Kenan Okludil	Assistant coach
(Turkey) Mehmet Yaşar Üçöz	Masseur

== Gallery ==
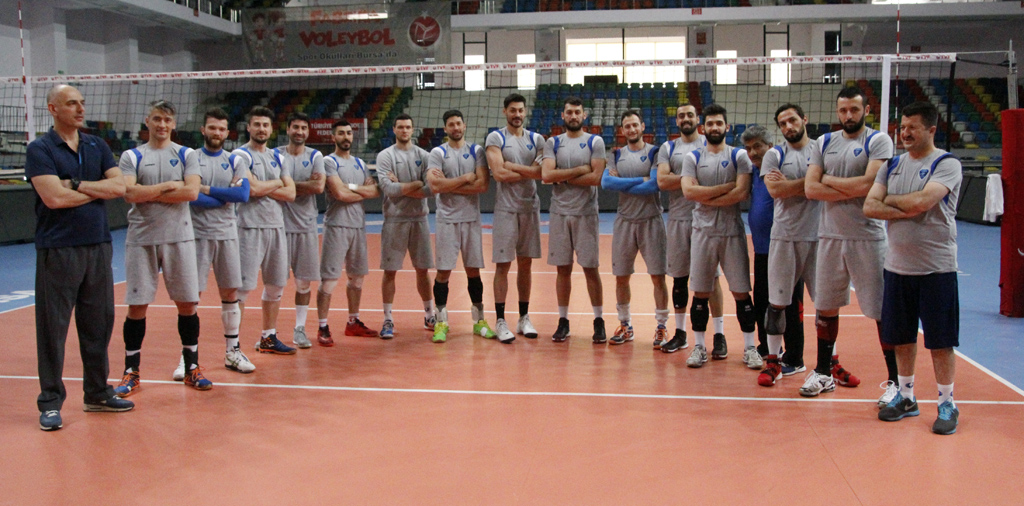

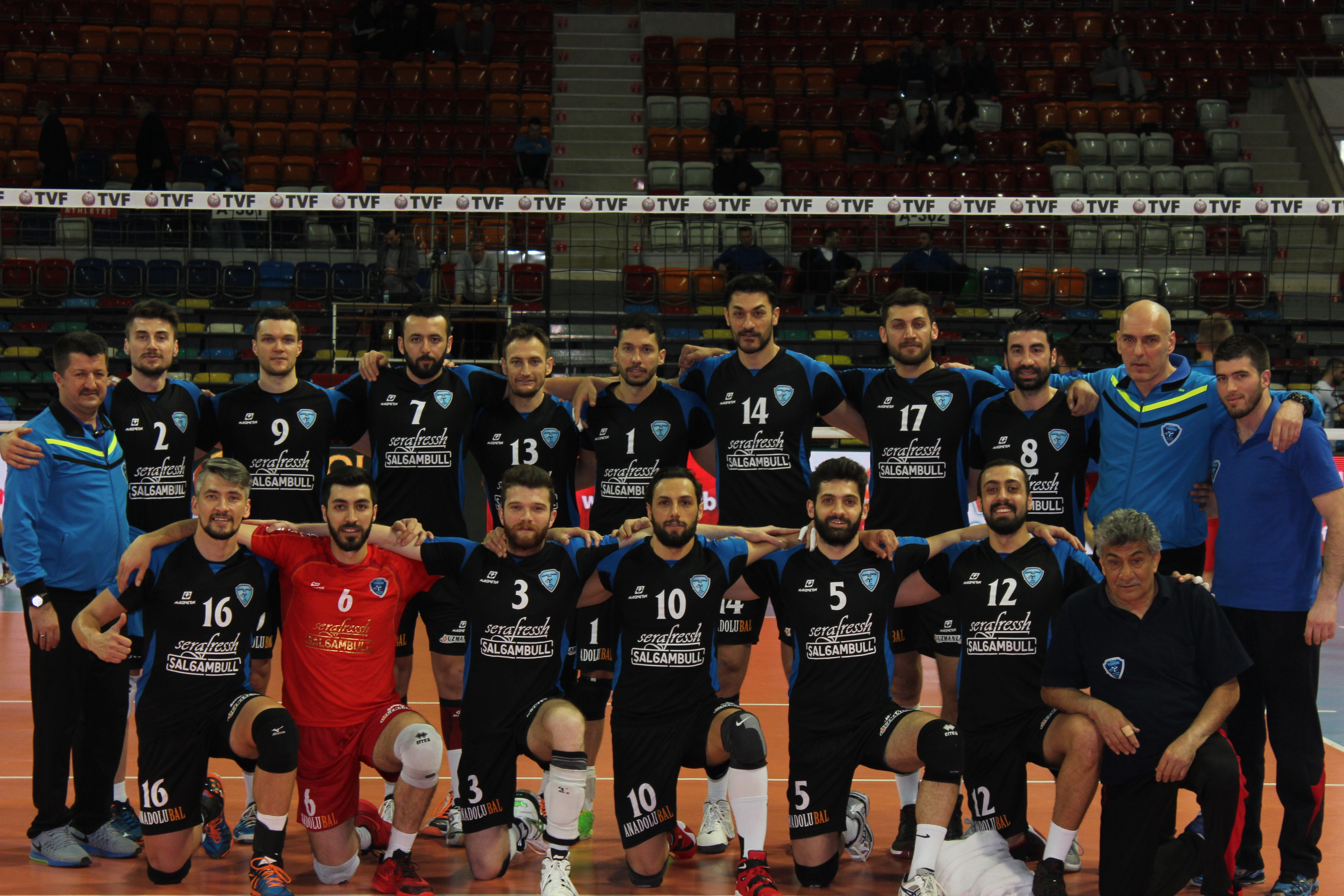

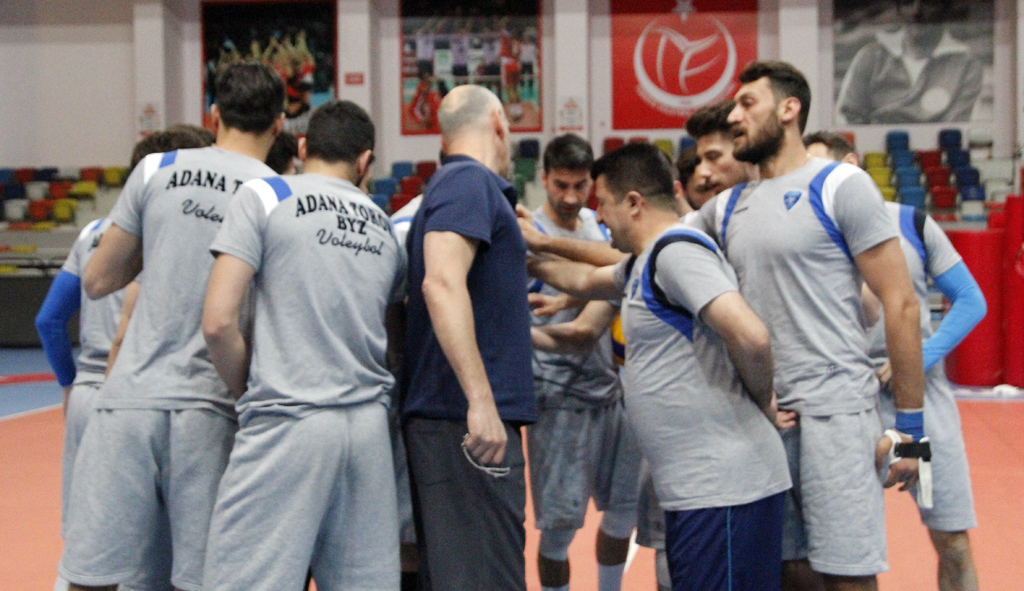

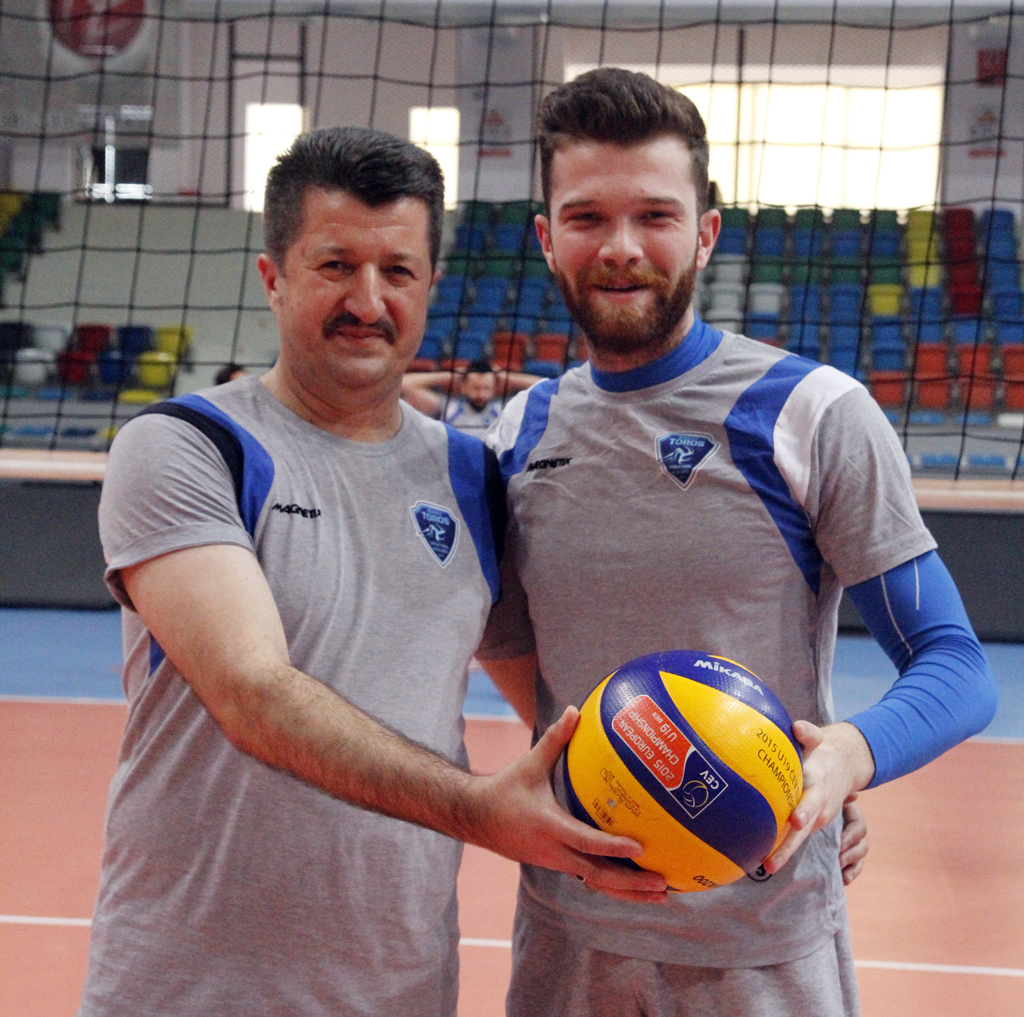
