= Widukindland =

District of Osnabrück, Germany

Coordinates: 52.2931°N 8.0903°E

Widukindland is a district of Osnabrück, Germany. It is situated in the north-east of the city, on the slopes of the Schinkelberg (Schinkel Hill). It arose from the former boundaries of Schinkel.

The Freiheitsweg (Freedom Way) and the Heimatweg (Homeland Way) were built in 1922.

This settlement north of Bremer Straße was transformed under Nazi rule in the 1930s into a small housing estate area. The zeitgeist of that era remains evident in the names of the district's streets today: for example “Vaterlandsweg” (Fatherland Way), “Kameradschaftsweg” (Comradeship Way), “Sigiburgweg” (Sigiburg Way), “Freiheitsweg” (Freedom Way), “Heimatweg” (Homeland Way), “Sachsenweg” (Saxon Way) and “Cheruskerweg” (Cherusci Way). During the planning stages, it was made sure that every house had a garden to promote self-sufficiency.

Since 1977 the area has been home to an important telecommunications tower.

The street “Freundschaftsweg” (Friendship Way) was built in 1953.

This district, characterised by its prevalence of single-family homes, large gardens and wooded areas, covers an area of 271.1 hectares and is home to about 4,700 people.

Good infrastructure is provided for its residents, namely:

- good public transport links (city bus lines 71, 72, E31 and Nachtbus (night bus) N7)
- good medical provisions (general practitioner, dentist, pharmacy, HHO treatment centre, ergotherapy practices)
- a primary school
- a youth centre (Jugend und Kultur im Widukindland e. V.)
- two denominational kindergartens and a children's store
- a Lutheran parish (Timotheus)
- a Catholic parish (St. Boniface)
- two sports clubs (TSV Widukindland, VfB Schinkel)
- local shops (bakery, fishmonger, florist etc.)
- service providers (garages, banks/savings banks, driving schools, hairdressers, beauticians, furniture dealerships, sanitary fitters)
- various restaurants (traditional/local, Japanese, Chinese, Italian)
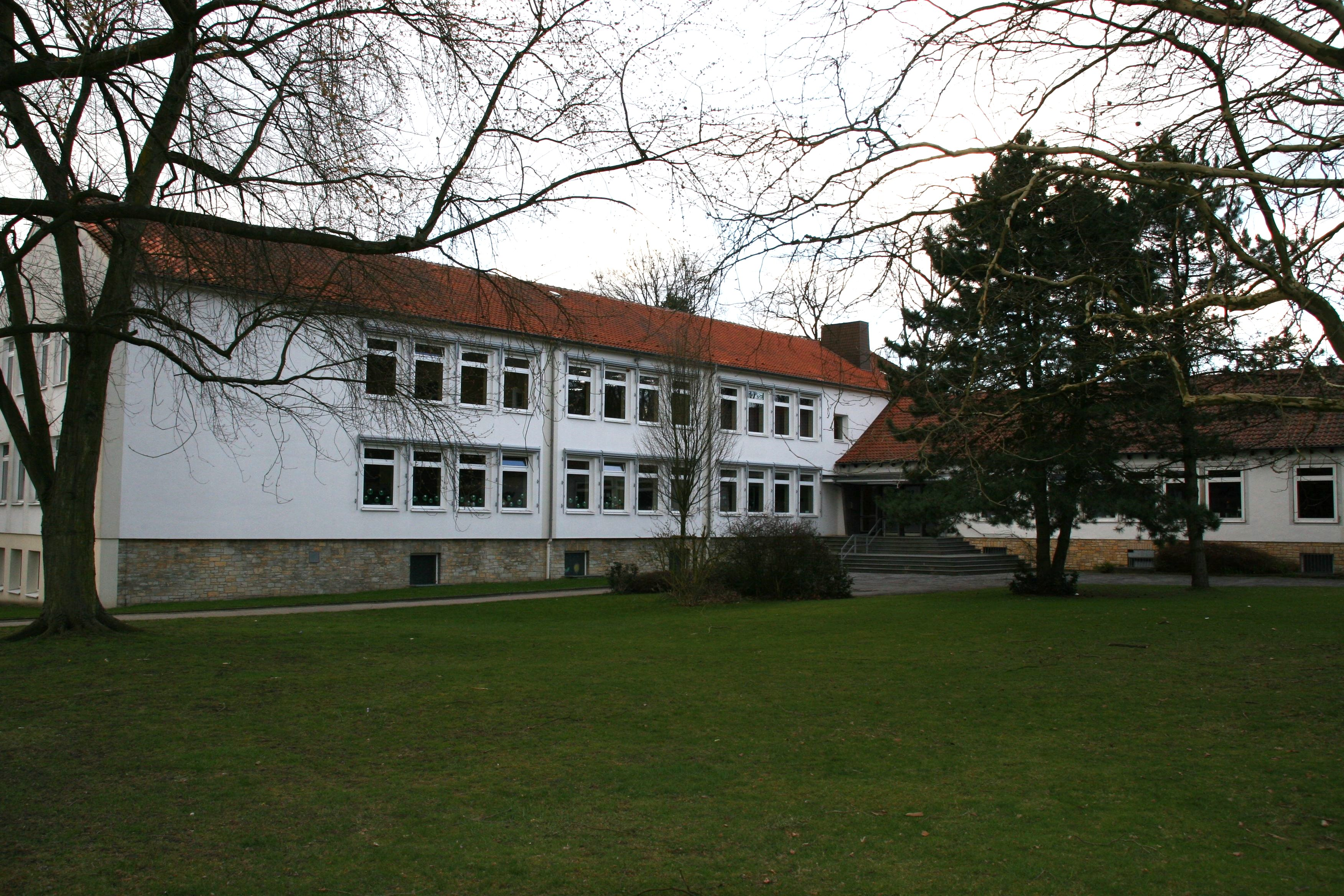
Grundschule Widukindland (Widukindland Primary School)

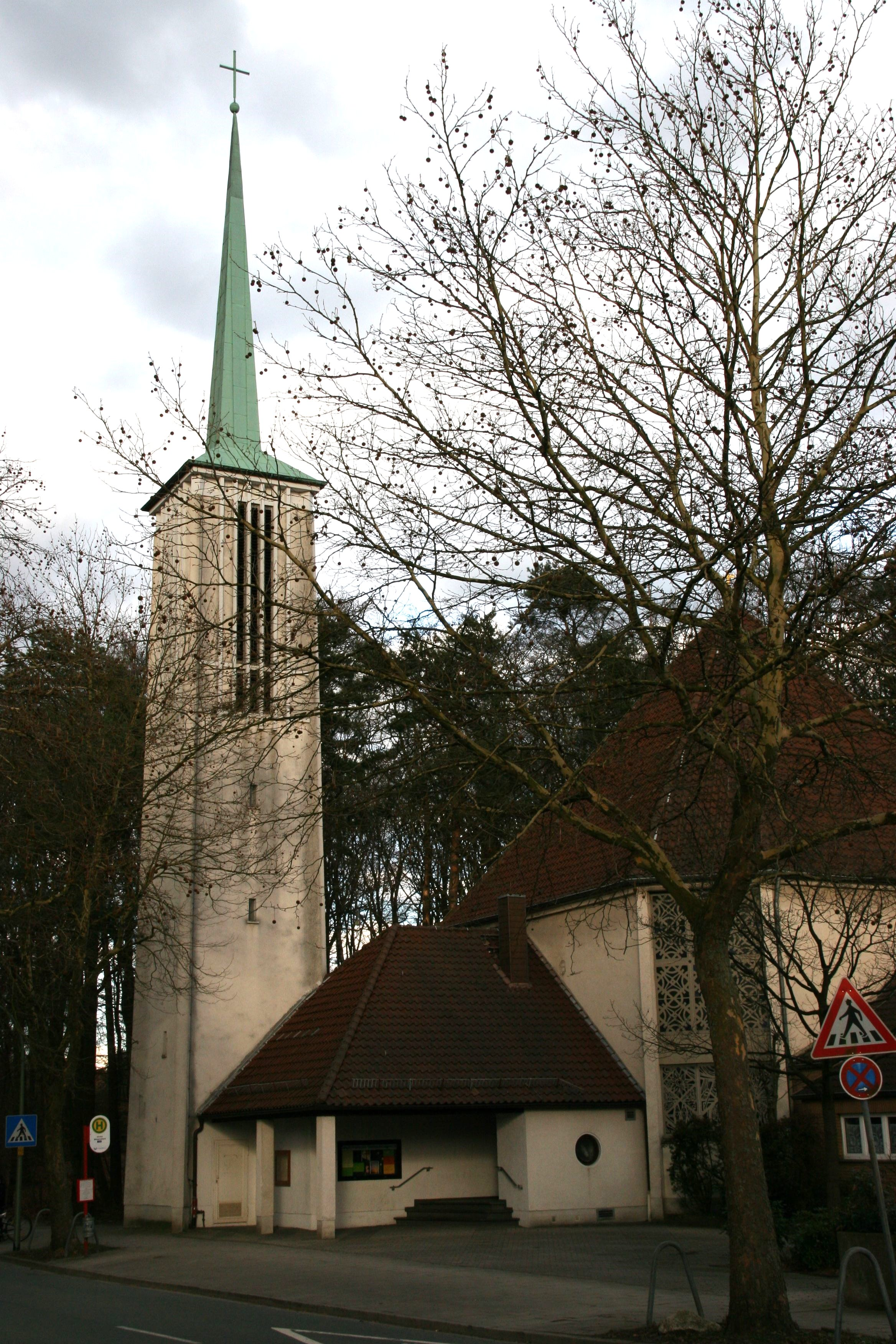
Timotheus Church (Lutheran)

The Schinkelberg green belt and the Gartlage, along with several meadows and fields, give residents good opportunities for recreation.

The district derives its name from the legendary Saxon duke Wittekind. Many of its streets and open spaces bear the names of notable Saxon tribes and also local personages.

== Places of interest ==
- The Schinkelturm (Schinkel Tower), situated on the Schinkelberg
- The Lutheran Timotheus Church, a sacral building of particular architectural interest built during the 1950s by architect Max H. Berling. Its first pastor was René Leudesdorff.

== Links ==
- Quarterly information from the Referat Stadtentwicklung und Bürgerbeteiligung (Department for Urban Development and Citizen Participation), Statistics department, 4/2008 (PDF file, 1.49 MB, in German)
- City of Osnabrück, Referat für Stadtentwicklung und Bürgerbeteiligung – Statistics -, 11/2009 (PDF file, 35.40 KB, in German)
