= Stadion an der Bremer Brücke =

Football stadium in Osnabrück, Germany

Coordinates: 52°16′51″N 8°04′16″E

- Bremer Brücke
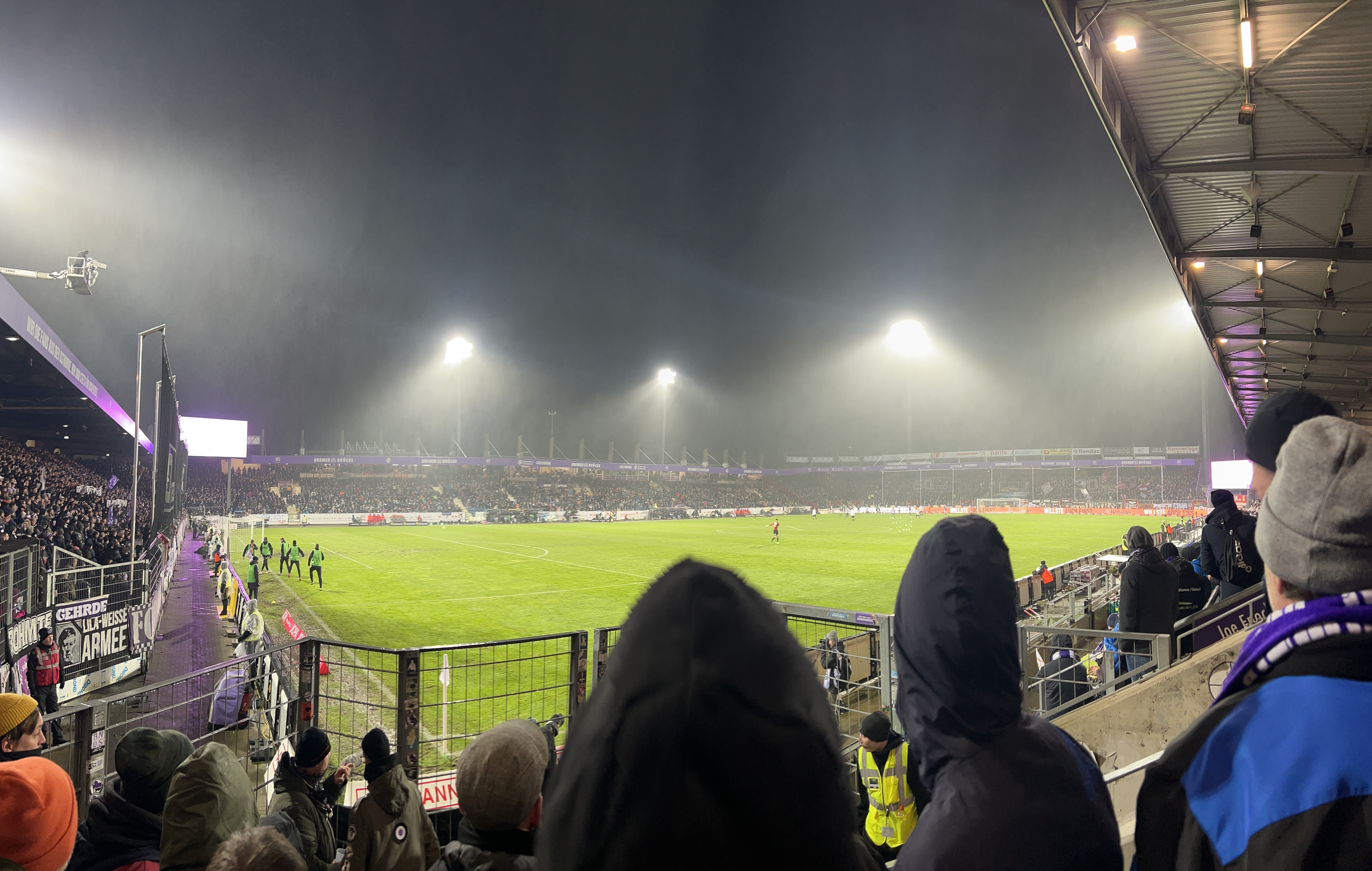
- Interactive map of Stadion an der Bremer Brücke
- Former names: Osnatel Arena (2004-2016)
- Location: Osnabrück, Germany
- Owner: VfL Osnabrück Stadion GmbH & Co. KG
- Operator: VfL Osnabrück GmbH & Co. KGaA
- Capacity: 16,100
- Surface: Grass
- Field size: 105 × 68

Construction
- Groundbreaking: 21 November 1931
- Opened: 22 May 1933

Tenant
- VfL Osnabrück

Stadion an der Bremer Brücke or Bremer Brücke is a football stadium in the Schinkel district of Osnabrück, Germany. It is used mostly for football matches and is the home stadium of VfL Osnabrück. The stadium currently holds 16,100 people and was opened in 1933.

From the 1970s, the stadium consisted of the Grandstand ("South Stand"), two roofed terraces behind the goals ("East Stand" and "West Stand"), and an uncovered terrace opposing the grandstand ("North Stand"). On 1 April 2008, demolishing works of the very old North Stand started to make way for a modern entirely roofed stand to be built at the site. The new stand was opened in August 2008; however, there has been controversy with a local resident whose property is situated very close to the ground. For this reason, the stand could not be fully completed earlier than 2011. With the construction of the new stand, the overall stadium capacity decreased to 16,667, but seating capacity rose to 6,192.

The name, which can be translated as "Stadium at Bremen Bridge", comes from a neighbouring railway bridge of the Osnabrück–Bremen railway line. In 2004, a local telecommunications company, Osnatel, bought the naming rights for the stadium and it was officially renamed as "Osnatel Arena". When this sponsorship contract expired in 2016, the stadium returned to its original name.

== See also ==
- List of football stadiums in Germany
- Lists of stadiums

Preceded by Ullevaal Stadion; Oslo	UEFA Women's Euro; Final Venue; 1989	Succeeded by Aalborg Stadium; Aalborg
