= Turgay Doğan =

Turkish volleyball player (born 1984)

Personal information
- Full name: Turgay Doğan
- Born: February 14, 1984 (age 42) Tokat, Turkey
- Height: 1.90 m (6 ft 3 in)

Volleyball information
- Position: Spiker
- Current club: (Turkey) Adana Toros
- Number: 13

Career
- Years: Team
- 2015: Adana Toros

National team
- Years: Team
- 2011: Turkey

Turgay Doğan (born February 14, 1984, in Tokat) is a Turkish volleyball player. He is currently a player of the Fenerbahçe Grundig. He also played for Tokat Belediye Plevne, Maliye Milli Piyango SK, Galatasaray and Mef Okulları. Doğan currently plays for Adana Toros at the Turkish Volleyball 2nd League.
