= Onur Çenik =

Turkish footballer

Personal information
- Date of birth: 24 September 1992 (age 34)
- Place of birth: Hagen, Germany
- Height: 1.87 m (6 ft 2 in)
- Position: Central defender

Team information
- Current team: Türkspor Dortmund
- Number: 4

Youth career
- 1996–2002: TSG Herdecke
- 2002–2003: TSC Eintracht Dortmund
- 2003–2010: Borussia Dortmund

Senior career*
Years	Team	Apps	(Gls)
2010–2013	Borussia Dortmund II	19	(0)
2013–2015	Karabükspor	7	(0)
2015–2016	Giresunspor	6	(0)
2017	Kastamonuspor	8	(0)
2017	Tepecikspor	6	(0)
2018–2021	SpVg Hagen 11		
2021–	Türkspor Dortmund		

International career
2009	Germany U18	1	(0)
2010	Turkey U18	2	(0)
- * Club domestic league appearances and goals as of 4 February 2018

Onur Çenik (born 24 September 1992) is a Turkish footballer who plays for German Oberliga Westfalen club Türkspor Dortmund.
