= Schinkel-Ost (Osnabrück district) =

Coordinates: 52.2667°N 8.1000°E

Schinkel-Ost is a district of Osnabrück, Germany. It originally lay within the former boundaries of Schinkel, which was incorporated into Osnabrück in 1914. Schinkel-Ost is home to roughly 3,500 residents. The evangelical Jakobuskirche (Jacobus Church), Catholic Rosenkranzkirche (Rosary Church), “Blau-Weiß” (blue-white) sports team, Diesterwegschule (Diesterweg School) and the Gesamtschule Schinkel (Schinkel Comprehensive School) are located in this district.
