= Türkspor Dortmund =

- Full name: Türkspor Dortmund 2000 e.V.
- Nickname: Die Türken (The Turks)
- Founded: 1 January 2000; 26 years ago
- Ground: Ischelandstadion, Dortmund
- Capacity: 16,500
- Chairman: Akin Kara
- Manager: Maximilian Borchmann
- League: Westfalenliga 2 (VI)
- 2025–26: Oberliga Westfalen (V), 19th of 19 (relegated)
- Website: https://www.instagram.com/tsd2000ev/?hl=en

Türkspor Dortmund is a German football club based in Dortmund, North Rhine-Westphalia. The club was founded in 2000 (although its roots date back to 1978) and currently plays in the Oberliga Westfalen, one of the fifth tiers of German football.

== History ==
The club's roots go back to the club SV Borsigplatz Gençlerbirliği, founded in 1991. They started playing in the 1992/93 season in the district league C and were promptly promoted to the district league B. In 1995, the team was promoted to the district league A, where the club became runner-up in the 1998/99 season.

In 2000, the club Türkspor Dortmund was founded, which took over the right to play in the district league A. Under the new name, the club was initially unable to build on this success and slipped back into the middle of the table.

In the 2009/10 season, the club did not compete and was therefore relegated to the district league B. There, the club was able to stabilize itself again and was promoted back to district league A in 2015. This was followed by immediate relegation before the team was promoted back to the district league A in 2018.

There, Türkspor finished runner-up behind Rot-Weiß Germania Dortmund in the following 2018/19 season and qualified for the promotion round to the district league after a 4-2 win against the runner-up of the parallel division VfB Lünen. There, Türkspor beat Eintracht Gelsenkirchen 5-1 and 6-1 and achieved promotion to the district league.

The 2019/20 state league season was canceled prematurely due to the COVID-19 pandemic. Dortmund were declared champions and promoted to the state league according to a quotient rule. Due to the ongoing pandemic, the following 2020/21 season was initially canceled and later annulled. Before the 2021/22 season, the club made headlines when it wanted to sign former Turkish international İlhan Mansız as coach. In the 2021/22 season, Türkspor became champions of the Landesliga and were promoted to the Westfalenliga. Marcel Reichwein became the league's top scorer with 35 goals. The 2022/23 season in the Westfalenliga was marked by a head-to-head race with local rivals FC Brünninghausen. Even though Türkspor won 28 games from 34 under coach Orhan Özkara, Özkara had to leave at the beginning of December 2022. His successor, Sebastian Tyrala, led the team to the championship and promotion to the Oberliga Westfalen. There, the upswing continued, especially in the second half of the 2023/24 season, and after a 4-2 victory over SG Wattenscheid 09, promotion to the Regionalliga West was made perfect on the penultimate matchday. It was the sixth promotion in seven years. In mid-March 2024, Türkspor Dortmund's patron, Dr. Akin Kara, resigned as president. His successor is the former football player Ömür Turhan.

== Stadium ==
Türkspor Dortmund played its home games on the Mendeplatz, which has space for 1500 spectators. The pitch is located in the Hafen district on the border with Lindenhorst. Since the Mendeplatz does not meet the requirements of the Regionalliga West and no alternative stadium has been found within the city, Türkspor Dortmund will play its home games in the Ischelandstadion in Hagen. However, due to renovation work, the first games of the 2024/25 season will have to be played at Velbert Stadium.

== Current squad ==
The current squad as of the 2024-25 season is as follows:

As of 24 January 2025

Note: Flags indicate national team as defined under FIFA eligibility rules; some limited exceptions apply. Players may hold more than one non-FIFA nationality.

No.	Pos.	Nation	Player
2	DF	TUR	Berkant Gedikli
3	DF	TUR	Serdar Bingöl
4	DF	GER	Maurice Rene Haar
7	FW	MAR	Ilias Anan
8	DF	GER	Cedrik Mvondo
9	FW	GER	Dennis Lerche
10	MF	KOS	Rilind Hetemi
11	FW	GER	Selim Gündüz
12	GK	GER	Max Burbaum
19	DF	MNE	Salmin Rebronja
20	FW	TUN	Firas Romdhane
21	DF	TUR	Mehmet Kaya
22	MF	TUR	Ali Hüseyin Gün
23	MF	ITA	Alessandro Tomasello

No.	Pos.	Nation	Player
24	MF	ALB	Steven Kodra
25	DF	TUR	Ali-Bey Yılmaz
28	FW	GER	Bernard Gllogjani
31	GK	GER	Veith Walde
33	GK	GER	Cedric Conner Golbig
38	MF	GER	Oğuzhan Kefkir
39	GK	GER	Franz Langhoff
42	MF	TUR	Ömer Akman
53	DF	GER	Nicolas Obas
77	MF	GER	Halilcan Doğan
—	DF	GER	Marlon Monning
—	MF	GER	Burak Gençal
—	FW	TUR	Ibrahim Bulut

== Notable people ==
- Kevin Großkreutz (2019–2020 as assistant coach in the district league)
- Marcel Reichwein (2020–2022 (District League), 2023–2024 (Oberliga Westfalen 2023/24) as a player)

== Achievements ==
- Promotion to the Regionalliga West: 2024
- Champions of the Westphalia League 2: 2023
- Champion of the regional league: 2022
- District League Champion: 2020

== See also ==
- Football in Germany
- List of football clubs in Germany
