= Onur Aydın =

Onur Aydın may refer to:

- Onur Aydın (basketball) (born 1979), a Turkish basketball player
- Onur Aydın (footballer) (born 1988), Turkish footballer
