= Onur Ağaoğlu =

Turkish architect, author, musician, and businessperson (born 1990)

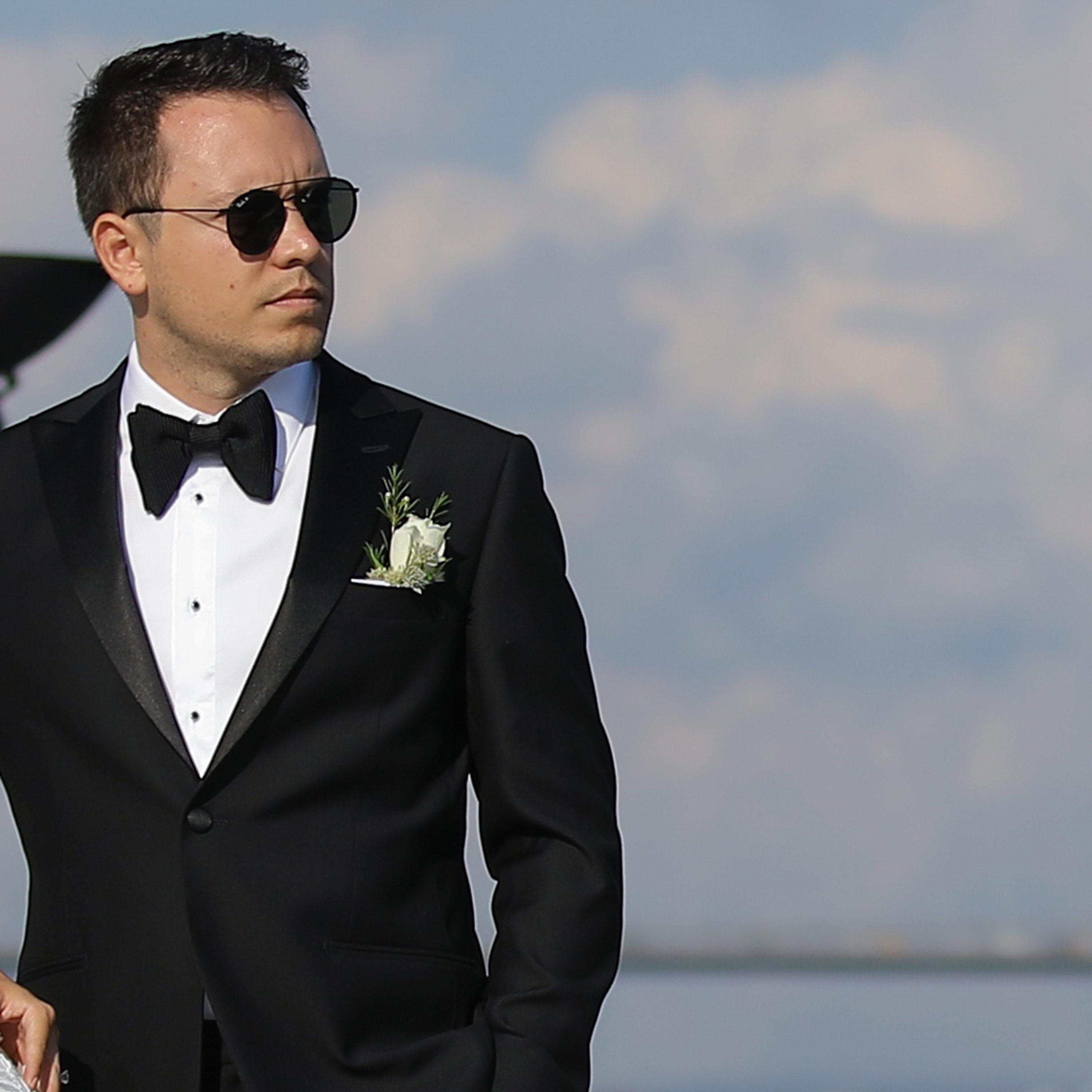
- Born: June 15, 1990 (age 36); Istanbul
- Education: Yeditepe University, Bilgi University
- Occupations: Architect, author, musician, and businessperson
- Known for: Founding Agaoglu’s Group of Companies
- Relatives: Ali Ağaoğlu
- Website: www.onuragaoglu.com.tr

Onur Ağaoğlu (born June 15, 1990) is a Turkish architect, author, musician, and businessperson.

== Early life and education ==
Ağaoğlu was born in Istanbul. He is a graduate of Yeditepe University, Istanbul (2011). He completed his MBA at Bilgi University in 2015. During his university years, he engaged in organic farming business.

== Career ==
While still in the university, Ağaoğlu established a shooting company called Skyfilm with a friend. He served as a cinematographer and the director of the firm. He created a music clip called Black Life and various YouTube videos.

After graduating from university, Ağaoğlu worked with Maslak 1453 for some years. He later launched the Ağaoğlu Concept brand. He founded the Agaoglu’s Group of Companies, a Turkish-based construction firm. He is a member of board of directors for the company. He also assisted in the launching of brands such as Self Park Car Park Solutions, Onurvinc Crane Solutions, Agavinc Crane Rent Solutions, and Skyfilm Aerial Film Solutions.

Ağaoğlu supports non-governmental organizations and also engages in social responsibility projects across Turkey.

== Books ==
Ağaoğlu has written and published two books:

- Entrepreneur: What I Want To Be
- The Meaning of Life.
