= Dodesheide =

Town in Osnabrück, Lower Saxony, Germany

Coordinates: 52.3039°N 8.0728°E

Dodesheide is a town in the borough of Osnabrück, Germany; with a population of roughly 7,900 residents it is located to the north-east of the city. Its boundaries are delineated in the north by the Vehrter Landstraße, in the west by the landwehr – a former defensive line around the town consisting of a bank and ditches – in the south by the Sandbach and the Osnabrück-Bremen railway line; the city boundary itself marks its eastern border. It is made up of sections of the former districts of Schinkel and Haste.

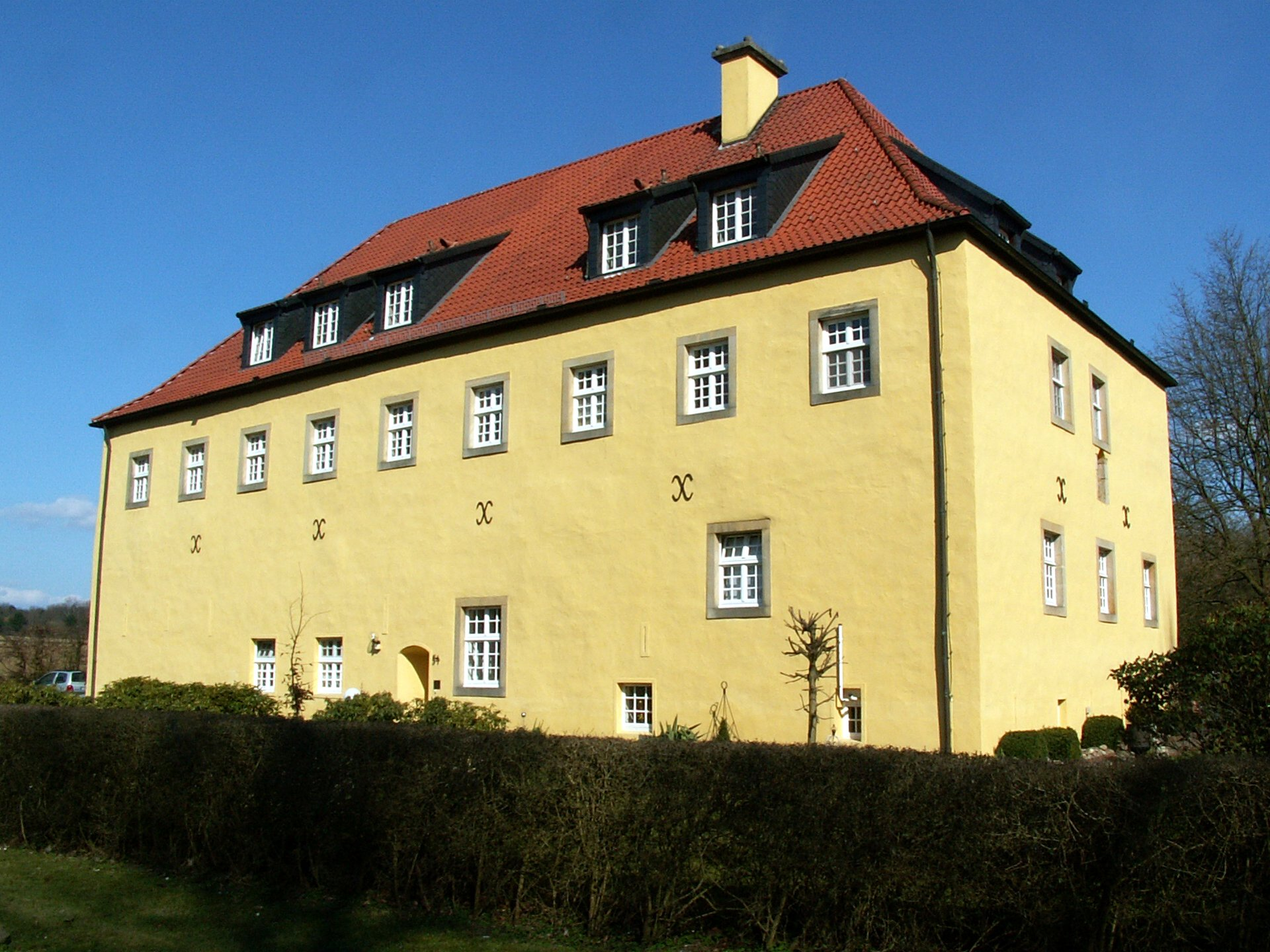
Haus Gartlage (Gartlage House)

The district’s most significant building is the Haus Gartlage, a former Jesuit seat which some years ago was converted into residences. Apart from this and a number of farms, most of the developments in the Dodesheide district are from the 20th century. Since the 1950s, the construction of residential space following set construction stages has been systematically encouraged; one notable case is the “Dodeshaus” model building project from the 1960s, focused on the area between Haster Weg and Ellerstraße where primarily bungalows are situated. The eastern part of the district continues to be characterised by the barracks of the British army and the attached soldiers’ residences; their final withdrawal in 2009 led to expectations of extensive structural change in the area.

There are two churches in Dodesheide: the Thomaskirche (Protestant) and the St. Franziskus Church (Catholic).

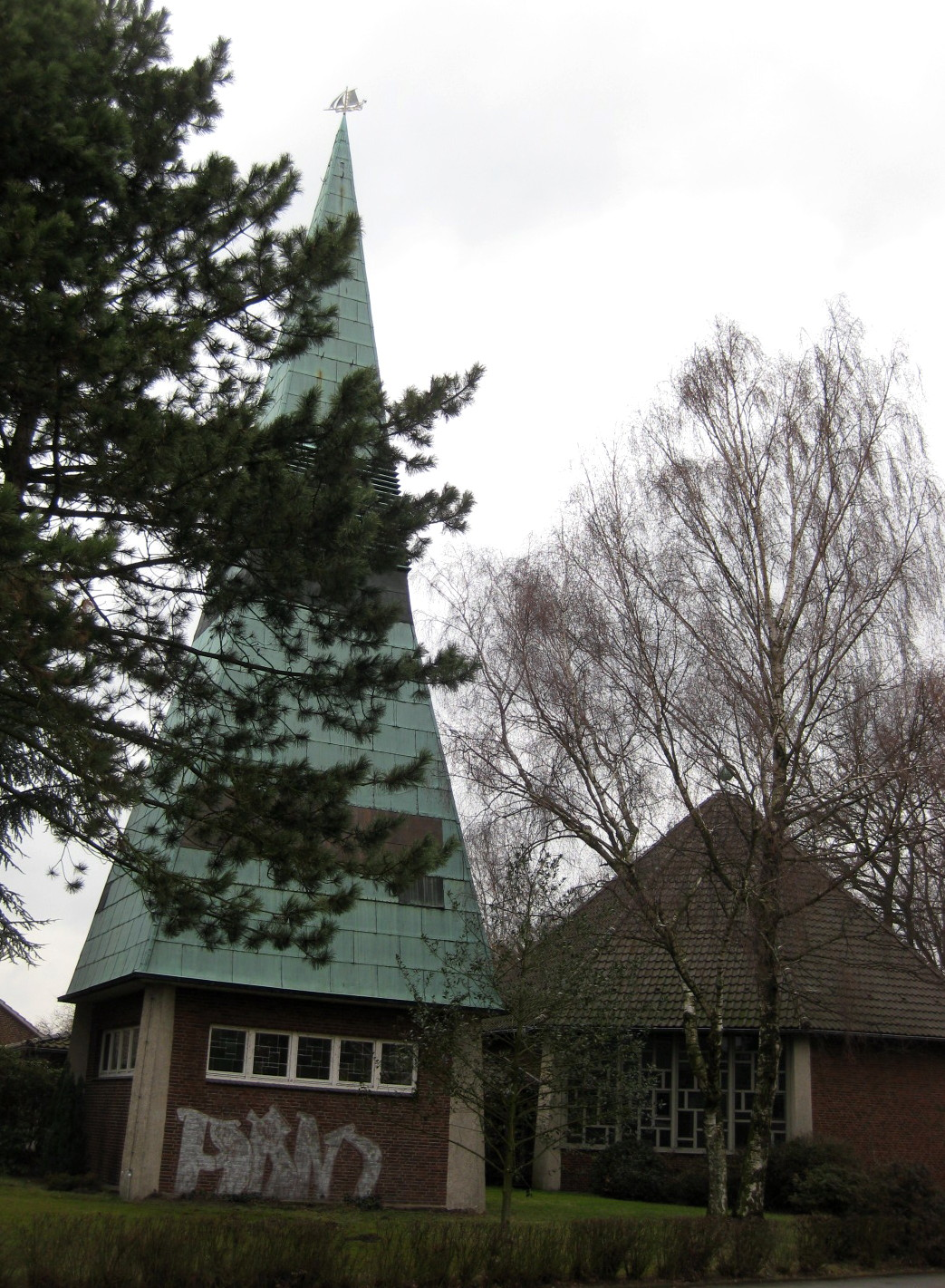
The former Reformed Protestant Erlöserkirche (Church of the Redeemer); used since 2010 by the parish of the Holy Mother Mary of the Greek Orthodox Church in Osnabrück and Münster

At the beginning of the 1970s, the possibility of making Dodesheide the location of the planned University of Osnabrück was discussed; in the end, however, the district of Westerberg was chosen. Its main offices are located at the Schloss Osnabrück (Osnabrück Palace). A remnant of the planning from that time remains in the form of the Dodesheide student residence located on Mecklenburger Straße; with 206 residents it is today the second largest student residence in the town.

The traditional perception of the name Dodesheide as linked to “Todesheide” (Death’s Heath) is most likely false. The name is assumed to derive from the Old German proper name “Dodo”: its proper meaning being “Dodos Heide” (Dodo’s Heath).

== Links ==
- Quarterly information from the Referat Stadtentwicklung und Bürgerbeteiligung (Department for Urban Development and Citizen Participation), Statistics Department, 4/2008 (PDF file, 1.49 MB, in German)
- City of Osnabrück, Referat für Stadtentwicklung und Bürgerbeteiligung – statistics -, 11/2009 (PDF file, 35.40 KB, in German)
