= Ischelandstadion =

Multi-use stadium in Hagen, Germany

Coordinates: 51°22′20″N 7°28′41″E

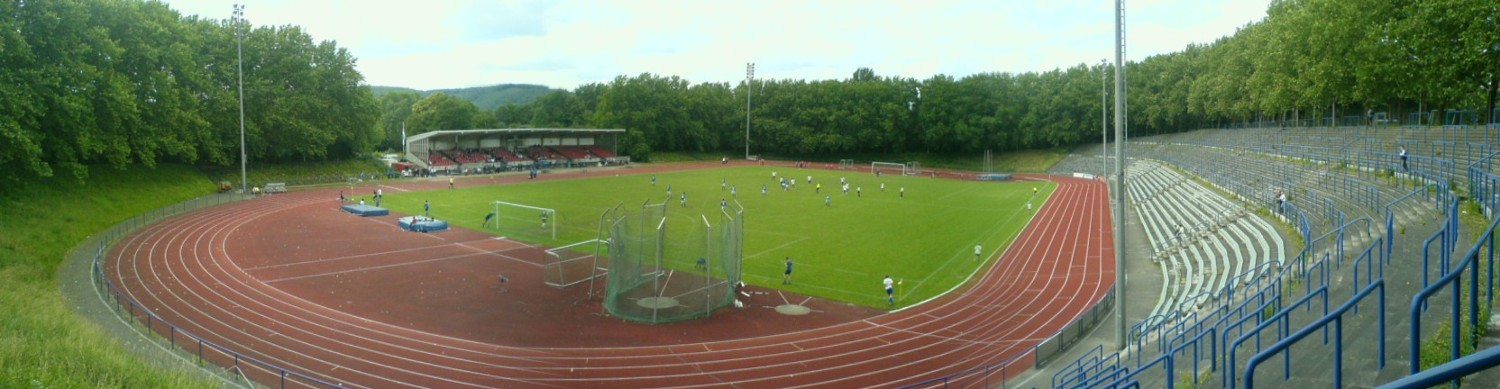
- Interactive map of Ischelandstadion
- Full name: Ischelandstadion
- Location: Hagen, Germany
- Owner: SSV Hagen
- Operator: SSV Hagen
- Capacity: 32,000 (record); 16,500 (current)

Construction
- Opened: 1926

Tenant
- SSV Hagen Türkspor Dortmund

Ischelandstadion is a multi-use stadium in Hagen, Germany. It is used as the stadium of SSV Hagen and Türkspor Dortmund matches. The capacity of the stadium is 16,500 spectators.
