= Yeşim Ağaoğlu =

Turkish artist and poet (born 1966)

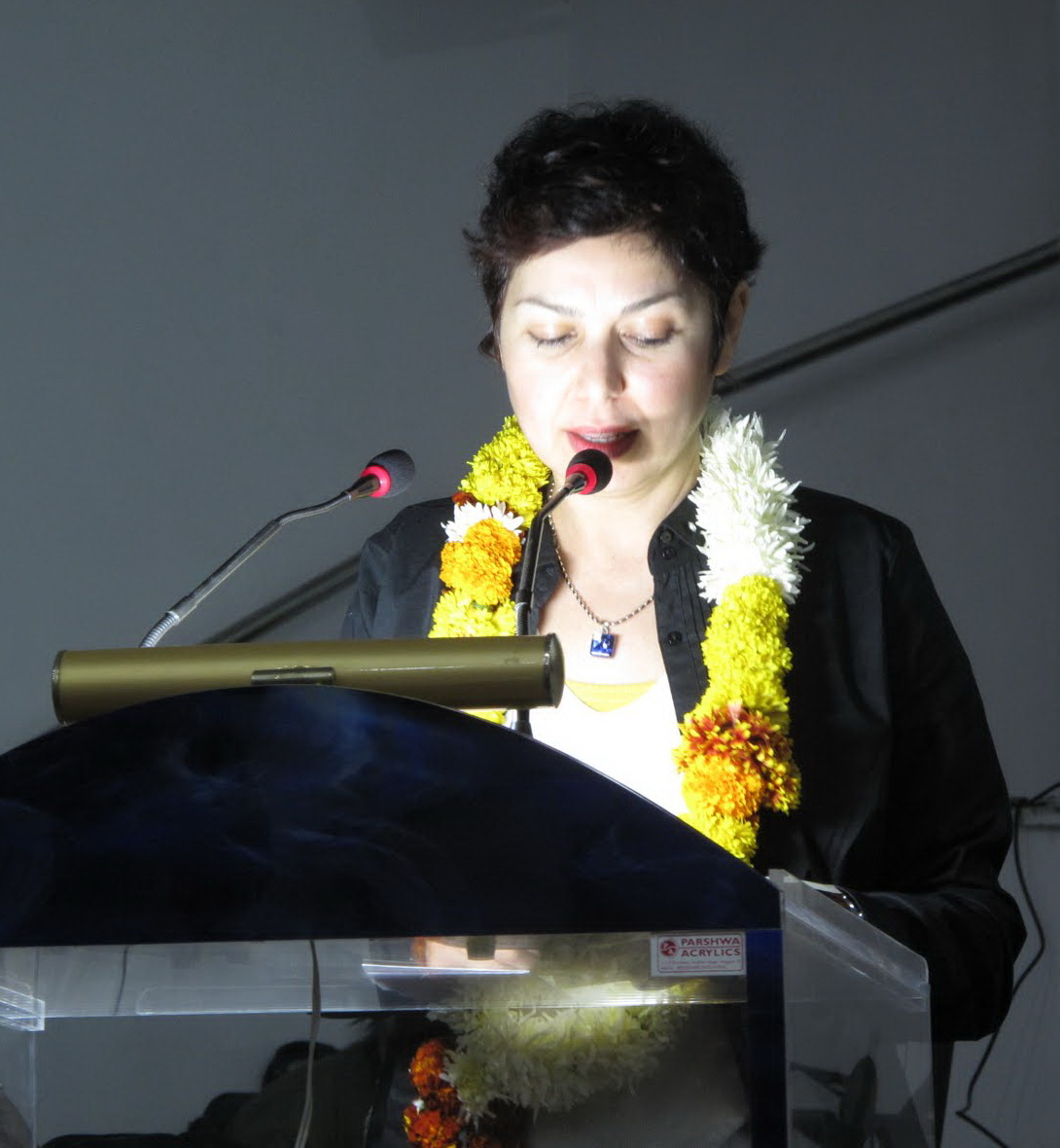
- Yeşim Ağaoğlu's poetry reading on Krytia-2011
- Born: January 21, 1966 (age 60); Istanbul, Turkey
- Education: University Of Istanbul (MA}
- Known for: visual art, poetry
- Movement: Contemporary art

Yeşim Ağaoğlu (born January 21, 1966) is a Turkish multidisciplinary artist and a poet who works with various mediums, especially concentrating on installation, photography and video. Her family comes from the city of Shusha in the Karabagh region of Azerbaijan. The most important thing for her in art is being interactive. She works on poetry (language) and art relationships, gender and feminism issues, architectural elements and political subjects. Since 1995 Agaoglu has produced nine poetry books that have made her famous as a female poet in the literary scene of Turkey.

== Life and career ==
Ağaoğlu was born in Istanbul, Turkey on January 21, 1966. She studied at the University Of Istanbul, Department Of Archaeology and Art History. She has a master of arts degree from the University Of Istanbul, Faculty Of Communications, Department of Radio-TV-Cinema. She attended part-time film lessons using a Super 8 mm film camera at the New York School of Visual Arts; these lessons has resulted in a short film called Loneliness, Machines And Meditation.

Her poems have been published in literary journals since the age of 18. She has seven poetry books that have been published in Turkey and two poetry books published in Azerbaijan. Ağaoğlu's poems have been translated into many languages, such as Azeri, Russian, English, Italian, and Spanish. She is a member of the International PEN and also a board member of BESAM (Creators of Scientific and Literary Works Association). Since 2012 she has been an Honored Member of PEN Union of Azerbaijani Writers.

Yeşim Ağaoğlu has been continuing contemporary art activities combining different disciplines since 1996. She has had four solo exhibitions in Azerbaijan, Georgia, Bosnia and Herzegovina and Norway. Ağaoğlu has participated in a number of exhibitions in countries like Germany, France, Poland, the Netherlands, Italy, Bulgaria, Uzbekistan, Korea, Brasil, Mongolia, and the USA. Since 2012 she has been an Honored Member of Union of Artists of Azerbaijan.

== Artwork ==
Ağaoğlu has concentrated on art making with performance, visual material and objects. At the beginning her poems, written on yellow paper with a conventional typewriter, occupied the center of these works. The yellow pages are a basic material and modest element of communication with the people, but when they are arranged in huge geometrical heaps in the exhibition spaces they also become a Fluxus installation. Her presence in the exhibition space is considered as performance, even if she does not make a performance in the sense that she is directly involved in the process of the artwork, but her continuous blending into the viewers' attendance gives the impression of a performance. Her approach to art-making is minimalist and modest. Avoiding popularity and sophistication she describes her works as "technically simple but conceptually rich."

As a photographer, Ağaoğlu journeys into the city's simple and elaborate images, focusing on hybrid architecture, human diversity, gender differentiations and well-hidden ideological symbols and manifestations.

Aware of the socio-political environment of her region, Ağaoğlu conveys her messages through strategies in art making.

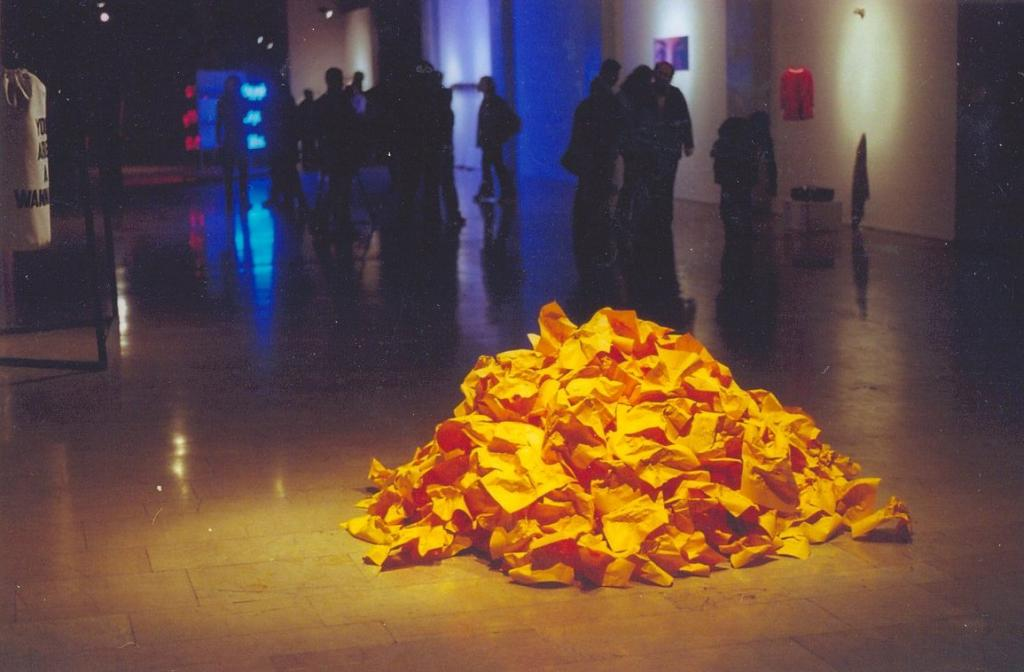

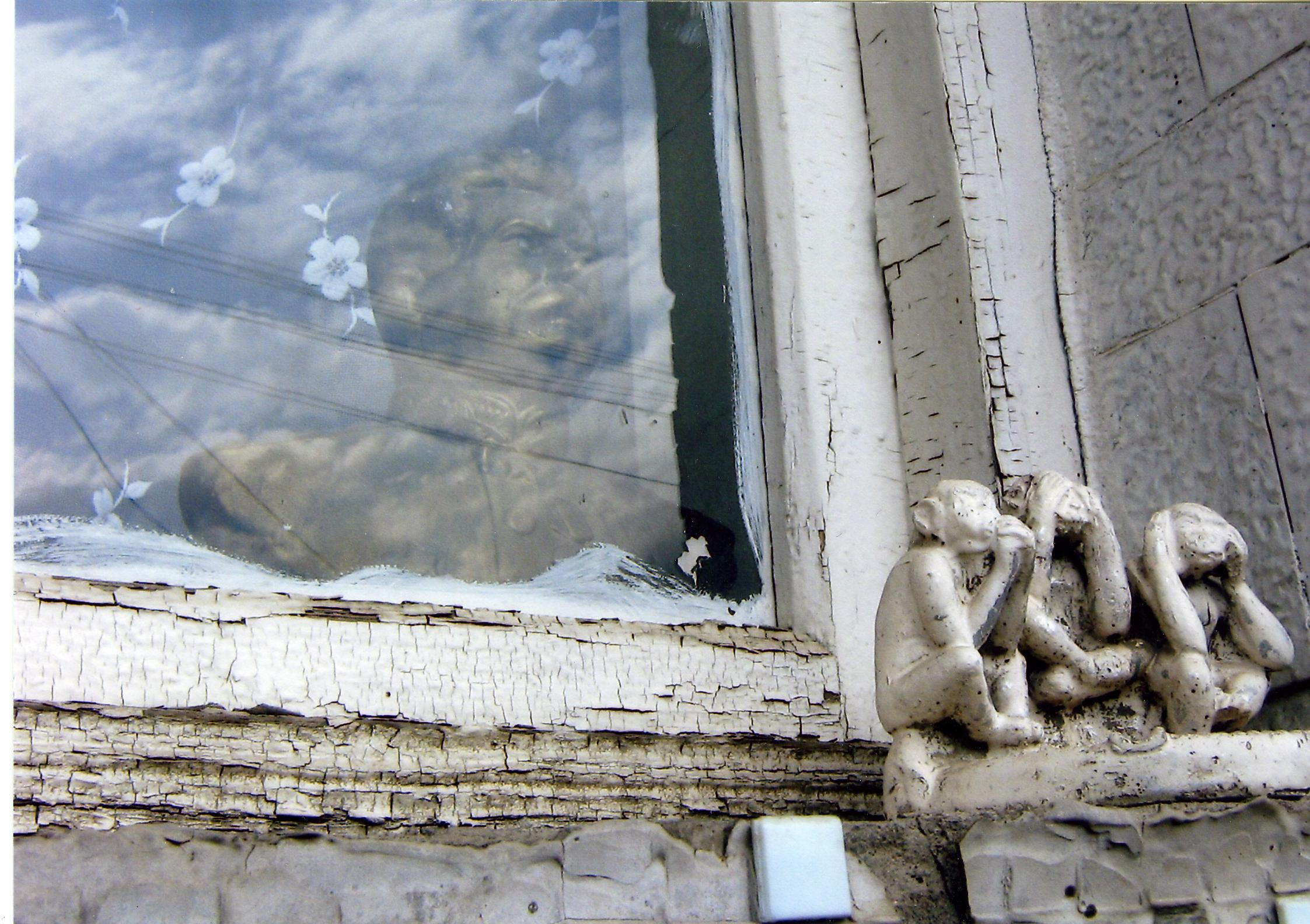

== Selected exhibitions and professional experience ==
=== Solo exhibitions ===
- 2012 — Center of Contemporary Art, Baku, Azerbaijan
- 2010 — Tou Scene Art Centre, Stavanger, Norway
- 2009 — Turkish Culture Center, Sarajevo, Bosnia and Herzegovina.
- 2008 — Caucasian House, Tbilisi, Georgia
- 2008 — Yeni Gallery, Baku, Azerbaijan.

=== Group exhibitions ===
- 2002 — "Sheshow", ATA Center for Contemporary Art, Sofia, Bulgaria.
- 2004 — "Turkish Delight", Video Art Show, Rio Modern Art Museum, Brazil.
- 2004 — "Field of Vision", Gallery Lab, New York, USA.
- 2005 — Tashkent Biennale, Uzbekistan.
- 2006 — "Caravansarai" International Festival, Heartgallery, Paris, France.
- 2006 — "Rejection Episodes Exhibition", Istanbul Express Festival in Vooruit Culture and Art Center Gent, Belgium.
- 2007 — 3d International Biennial of Contemporary Art "Aluminium", Shirvanshakh's Palace, Baku, Azerbaijan
- 2008 — "Steps of Time" Modern and Contemporary Azerbaijan Art, Dresden State Museum of Art, Germany
- 2008 — "Artisterium" 1st Tbilisi International Contemporary Art Exhibition and Art Events, Karvasla Tbilisi History Museum, Georgia
- 2008 — "Immagino" Workshop, Genova, Italy.
- 2008 — "7848 km Korean-Turkish Exchange Exhibition", Inchon, Korea.
- 2008 — "Reasonable", Hafriyat, Istanbul, Turkey.
- 2009 — "Dirty Story", Group exhibition, BM Suma Contemporary Art Centre, Istanbul, Turkey.
- 2009 — "Istanbul next wave", Akademie der Künste, Berlin, Germany.
- 2009 — "Istanbul off Independent Art Space Exhibition&Forum", Bethanien, Berlin, Germany.
- 2010 — MONGOLIA 360' Land Art Biennale, Mongolian National Modern Art Gallery, Ulaanbaatar
- 2010 — "USSR-remix", group exhibition, Art Centre Tou Scene, Stavanger, Norway
- 2010 — "OPENLY" International Women Video art exhibition in frame of "Istanbul 2010- Capital of Culture of Europe", Antrepo5, Sanat Limani, Istanbul, Turkey
- 2011 — "Collective Privacy", C.A.M Galery, Istanbul, Turkey.
- 2011 — Turkish Human Rights Association 20th Year exhibition, Tutun Deposu, Istanbul, Turkey
- 2011 — Artist in Residency, Almeria, Spain
- 2012 — Critical Art Ensemble, Documenta 13, Kassel, Germany
- 2012 — Fictions and Dissentions, 3rd Canakkale Biennale, Turkey
- 2012 — Out of Place, Corpo 6 Gallery, Berlin, Germany
- 2013 — Discarted, Hayaka Art gallery, Istanbul, Turkey
- 2013 — Black Sea Calling, Hilger BROT Kunsthalle, Vienna, Austria
- 2014 — The Warnth of a Patchwork Quilt, 8th Alanica, NCCA, Vladikavkaz, Ossetia, Russia
- 2014 — "Re-Museum" International Contemporary Art Exhibition, National Gallery, Tbilisi, Georgia
- 2014 — "Deprivation", Gallery Arsenal, Bialystok, Poland
- 2014 — "Small is Beautiful", Kuad Gallery, Istanbul, Turkey

== Poetry ==
Since 1995, Yeşim Agaoğlu has produced nine poetry books. The emphasis in her poems is on exploration of the most obscure dreams, desires, and intentions of the soul and the unpredictable relations between individuals; however, in between the layers of poetic descriptions she allows the reader to pass through a socio-political terrain that reflects her critical approach to the order of things. She discloses this complexity in a surrealist mode intertwined with an exhilarating openness of subject and form. Her imaginative qualities also owe much to her education in archeology and cinema.

=== Poetry books ===
- "yanlışlar şehrinde randevu" ("rendezvous in the mistaken city" (October 1995) Liman publications, İstanbul.
- "hırsızlama aşklar, gri yalnızlıklar" ("love stolen, loneliness grey" (November 1996)) Liman publications, İstanbul.
- "portakal tek meyve değildir" ("orange is not the only fruit " (March 1997)) Liman publications, İstanbul.
- "başka gezegenin insanları" ("people of another planet" (March 1997)) Liman publications, İstanbul.
- "new york blues" ("new york blues" (March 1997))Liman publications, İstanbul.
- "özlem şehirleri" ("missing cities" (2006)) Free Writers Society publications, Baku, Azerbaijan.
- "eflatun sır" ("purple secret" (March 2007)) Yitik Ülke publications, Istanbul.
- "güllerin ağırlığı" ("heaviness of the roses" (2007)) By the support of Azerbaijan and Turkish Ministry of Culture, published in Russian and Turkish, Baku, Azerbaijan
- "sana şiir yazmasam olur mu" ("you dont mind if i dont write poems to you"(2011) Yitik Ülke publications, Istanbul)

=== Festivals and literature events ===
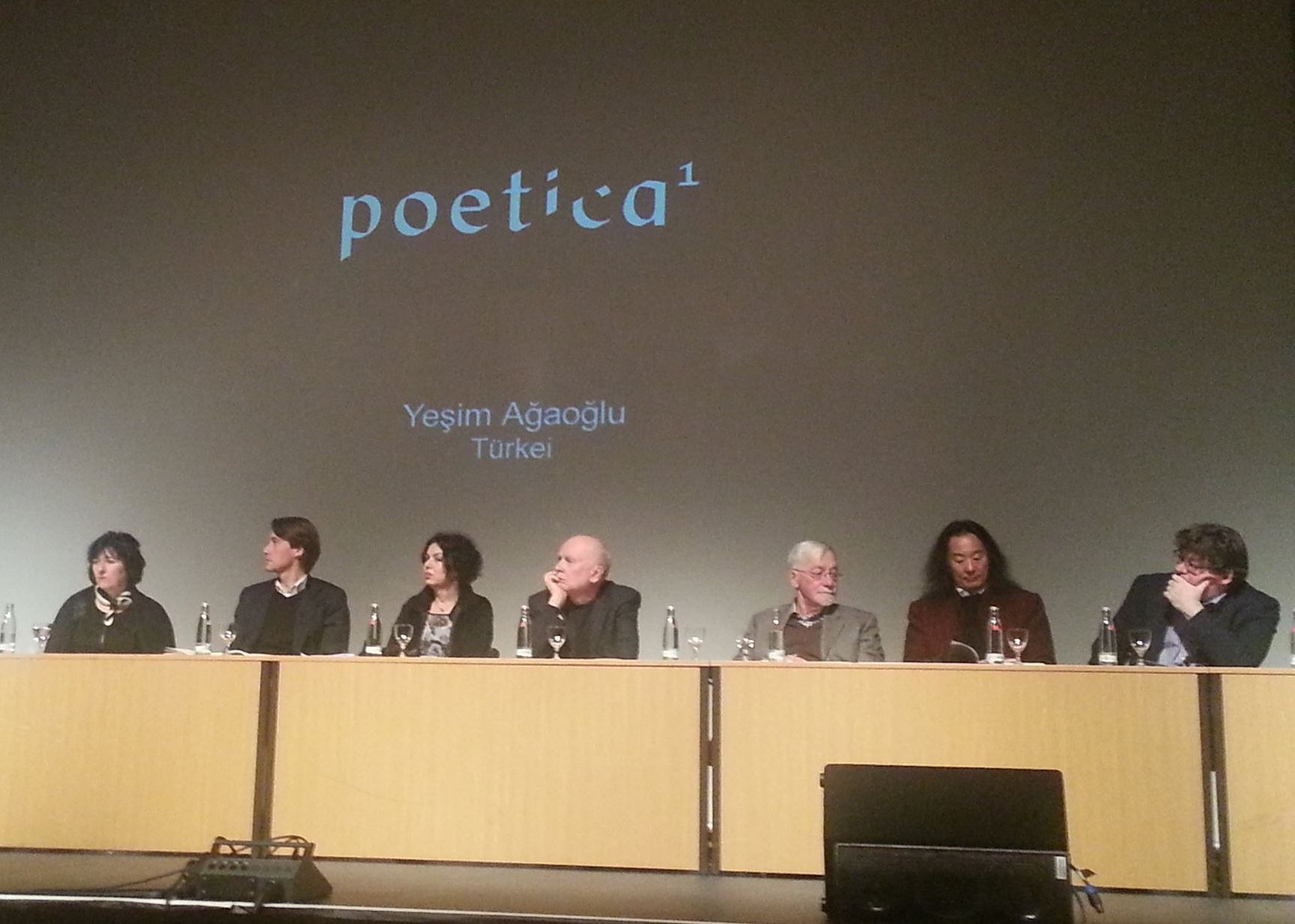
Yesim Agaoglu's participation in festival "Poetica1"

- 1998 — Residency in International Writers and Translators House, Rodos Island, Greece
- 1998 — Darul Ihsan University, Chief guest in residency, World 1st Poetry Day celebration, Dhaka, Bangladesh
- 1999 — 6th International Mediterranean Poets Meeting, Bodrum (Halicarnassus), Turkey
- 2010 — Solo Poetry Reading, Archaeological Museum, Stavanger, Norway
- 2010 — 49th Struga International Poetry Festival, Macedonia
- 2011 — Krytia International Poetry Festival, Nagpur, India
- 2011 — 10th Sarajevo International Poetry Festival
- 2011 — 3d Sadho International Poetry Film Festival, New Delhi, India
- 2012 — "Guest poet and poetry reading for connection of poetry and theater talk", Turkish PEN Writers' Club event, Ahmet Hamdi Tanpınar Literature Museum, Istanbul, Turkey.
- 2012 — "Special guest of poetry talk, poetry reading and receiving Azerbaycan PEN Writes' Club Honorary Membership", Azerbaijan Writers Union, Baku, Azerbaijan.
- 2012 — "Spring poetry rain", 26 May, Cyprus.
- 2012 — "Poetry Book Signing Day", TUYAP Book Fair, Istanbul.
- 2012 — "1 th of November Writers In The Banishment Day", Turkey PEN international event participant, (With participation of International PEN Club President), Istanbul.
- 2013 — "Turkey PEN Club World Poetry Day", organised by French Cultural Center, Istanbul.
- 2013 — "5th International Azerbaijan Poet's day" (getting prize, by the honour of Azerbaijani poet Mikail Müşvik), Baku, Azerbaijan.
- 2013 — "4th Ordu International Literature Festival" (Literature and Cinema Relations), Ordu, Turkey
- 2015 — "Poetica I", Festival für Weltliteratur 26.–31.1.2015 – Köln
