= Ali Ağaoğlu =

Turkish real estate developer and businessman (born 1954)

- Born: Ali İbrahim Ağaoğlu; 3 January 1953 (age 73); Of, Trabzon, Turkey
- Occupation: Businessman
- Children: 5

Ali İbrahim Ağaoğlu (born 3 January 1953) is a Turkish real estate developer and businessman, who has a net worth of $1.6 billion. He is the founder and chairman of the board of Ağaoğlu Group.
