= Onur Kurt =

Turkish volleyball player (born 1992)

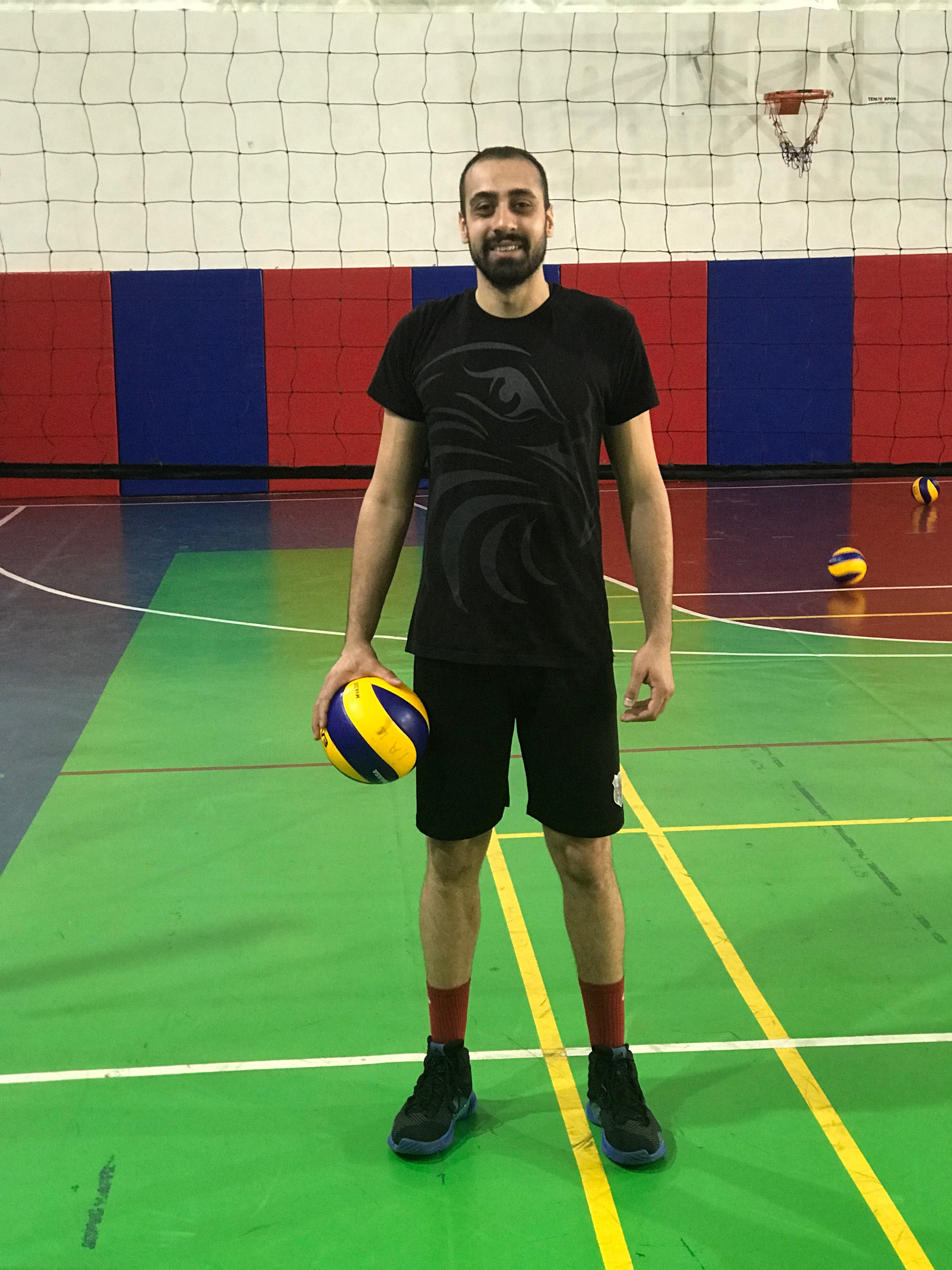

Personal information
- Born: 18 July 1992 (age 34); Istanbul, Turkey
- Height: 1.97 m (6 ft 6 in)

Volleyball information
- Position: Middle blocker
- Current club: Beşiktaş JK (men's volleyball)
- Number: 10

Onur Kurt (born 18 July 1992) is a Turkish volleyball player, who competes for Beşiktaş JK. He plays as a middle blocker.
