= Rubbenbruchsee =

Artificial lake in Osnabrück, Germany

Coordinates: 52.2868°N 7.9888°E

The Rubbenbruchsee is an artificial lake on the western side of Osnabrück, Germany, which comprises part of a larger local recreation area. It covers an area of roughly 24 hectares and has a length of about one kilometre. Its width varies from around 100 to 300 metres, its depth from 2 to 24 metres.

== Geography ==
Located roughly four kilometres north-west of Osnabrück city centre, the Rubbenbruchsee forms a border of sorts between the districts of Westerberg and Atter. In the north-east the district of Eversburg borders on the local recreation area.

The lake is positioned in a north-south-oriented lowland area several hundred metres wide, known as the “Rubbenbruch”. In geological terms it is known as a “rift valley”, formed by the orogeny which also produced the hilly area surrounding Osnabrück. Vestiges of the old territorial army of Osnabrück are still visible around the Rubbenbruch.

The lake’s surroundings are characterised by widespread woodland and meadows, essentially making up an urban offshoot of the TERRA.vita Nature Park. The primarily agricultural area of Atterheide, home to the eponymous airfield, lies to the west of the lake. In the east are located two wooded areas: the Heger Holz and the Natruper Holz, slightly north of the former. These are also used as recreation areas. To the south is marshland and another wooded area: the Hakenhof Holz, and to the south-east the Osnabrück clinical centre on Finkenhügel. There is also a “green link” which heads out eastwards from the Rubbenbruchsee through Heger Holz and Westerberg, almost reaching the city centre.

== Origins ==
Planning for the lake was conducted by Professor Hartmut Peucker in collaboration with the municipal parks commission in Osnabrück. Dredging of the sand at the Rubbenbruch began in 1968; it took until 1991 before the final stage of construction of the lake was completed.

== Leisure activities ==
The Rubbenbruchsee’s idyllic flair and close proximity to the city make it a popular tourist attraction, especially during the summer months. The lake is surrounded by a 3.2 km footpath with numerous benches, giving the area additional appeal to joggers and cyclists. A parkrun is held at the lake every Saturday morning. On the north side of the lake paddleboats can be rented – this area is also home to restaurants, a car park and a miniature golf course. To the south the land is mostly meadow; the only island on the lake is located in this area, along with a kids’ play area and spaces for grilling.

Fishing is permitted on the western banks of the lake. Bathing and swimming are prohibited in accordance with nature protection guidelines – for this purpose the Attersee, located a few kilometres away, should be used instead.

=== Equestrian sports ===
The area surrounding the Rubbenbruchsee is home to a number of equestrian farms, whose riders are often seen around the area of the lake. Special bridlepaths have been set up around the Rubbenbruch so that riders do not obstruct walkers and cyclists; some of these run parallel to the walking and cycle paths with only a few metres of separation.

== Photo gallery ==
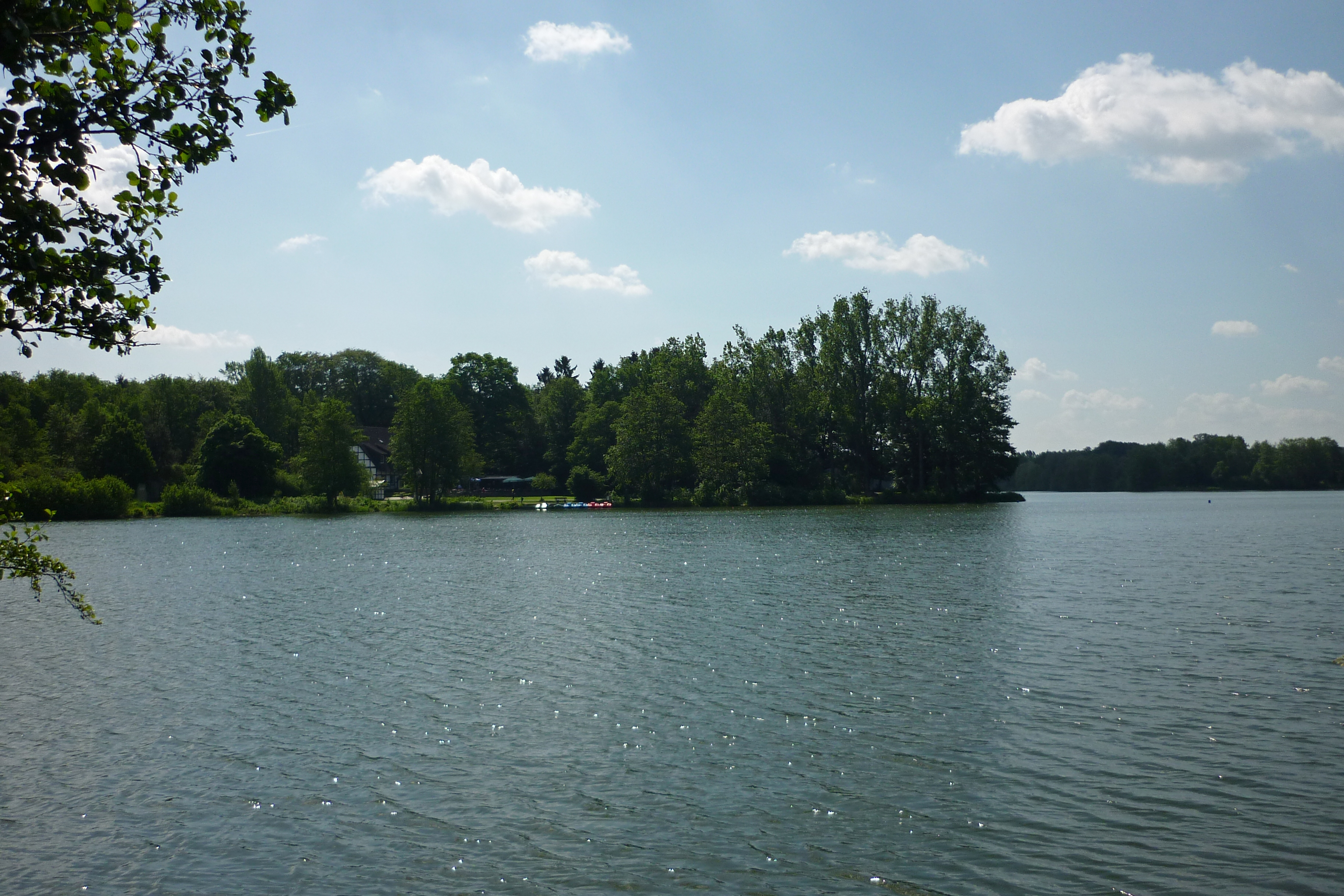
The Rubbenbruchsee as viewed from the north (May 2011)

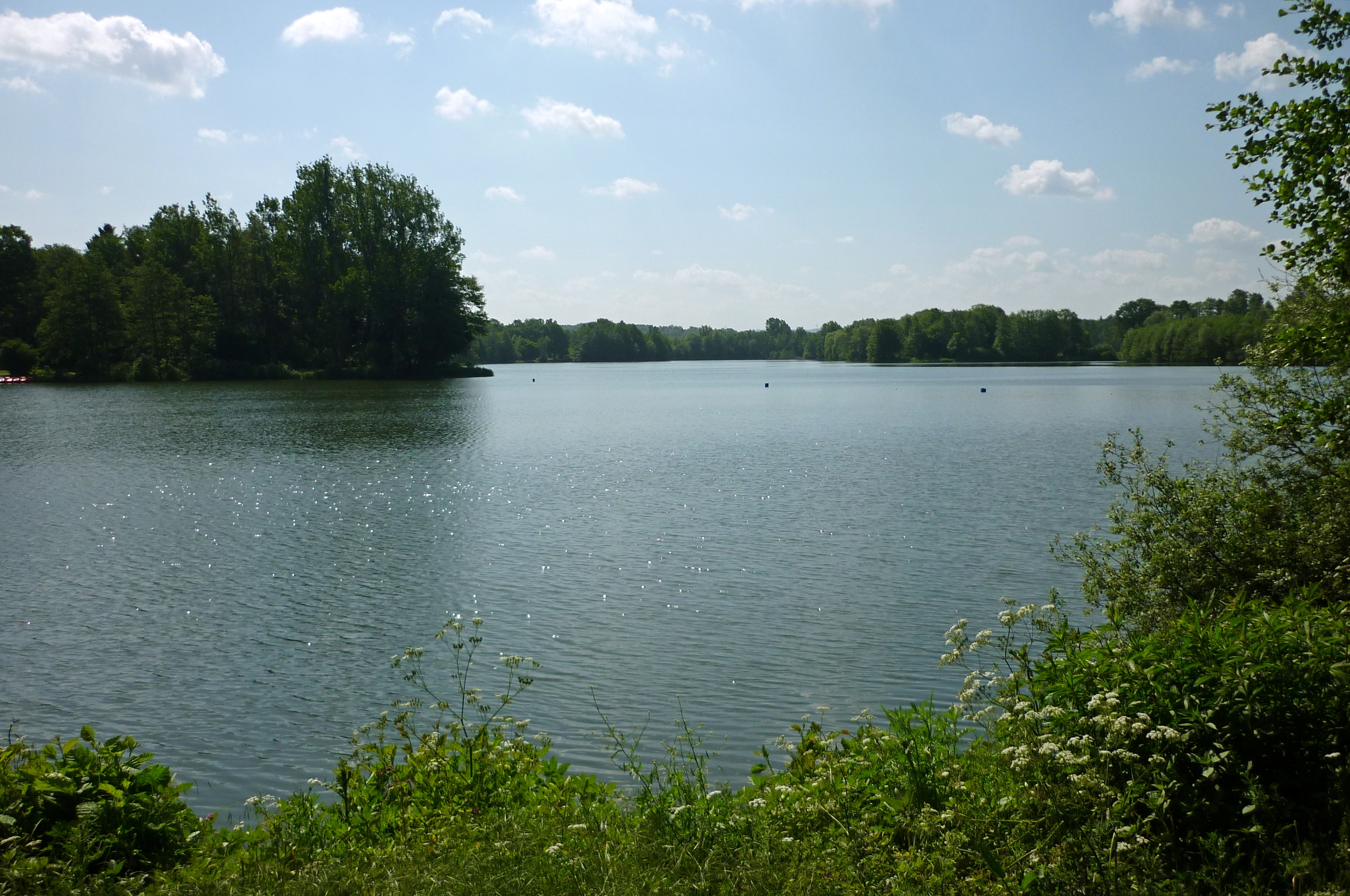
Another view from the north (May 2011)

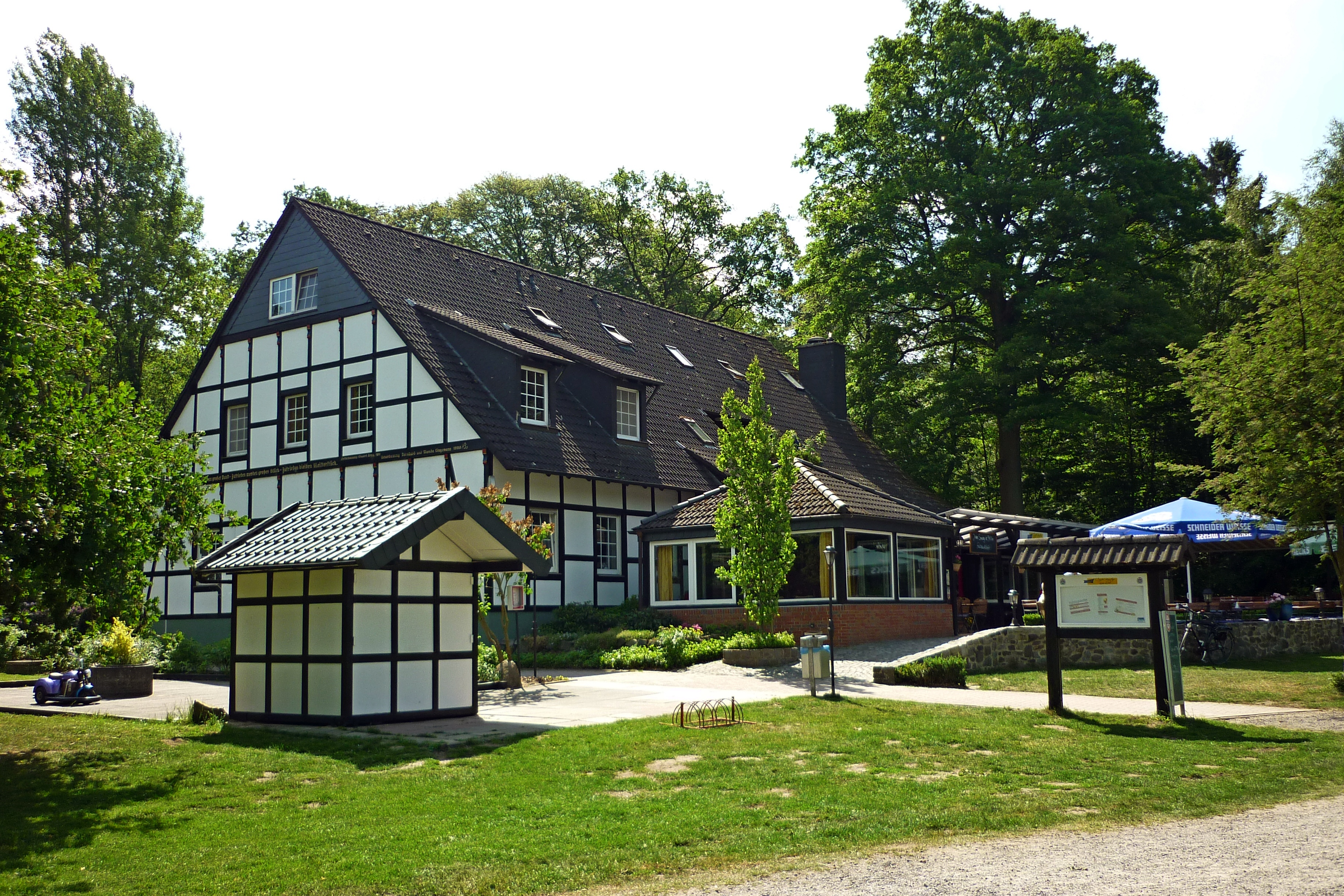
Restaurant on the north-east bank

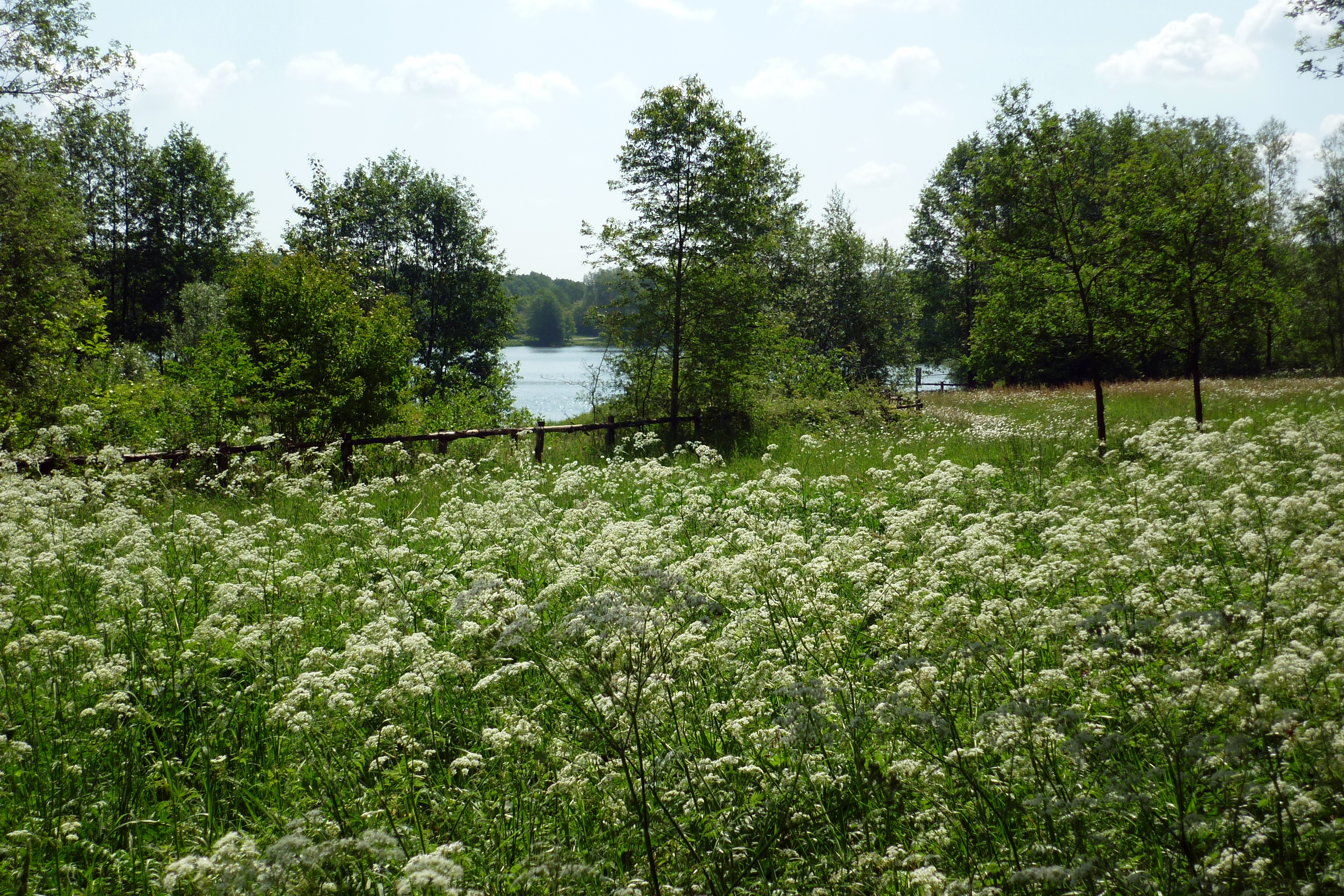
Meadow with view of the lake

== Literature ==
- Peucker, H., Der Rubbenbruchsee: Entstehung und Entwicklung (edited by Osnabruck city council - environment department) (Osnabrück, 2006) (ISBN 978-3-929979-78-7)
