= Weststadt (Osnabrück district) =

District of Osnabrück, Lower Saxony, Germany

Coordinates: 52.2728°N 8.0242°E

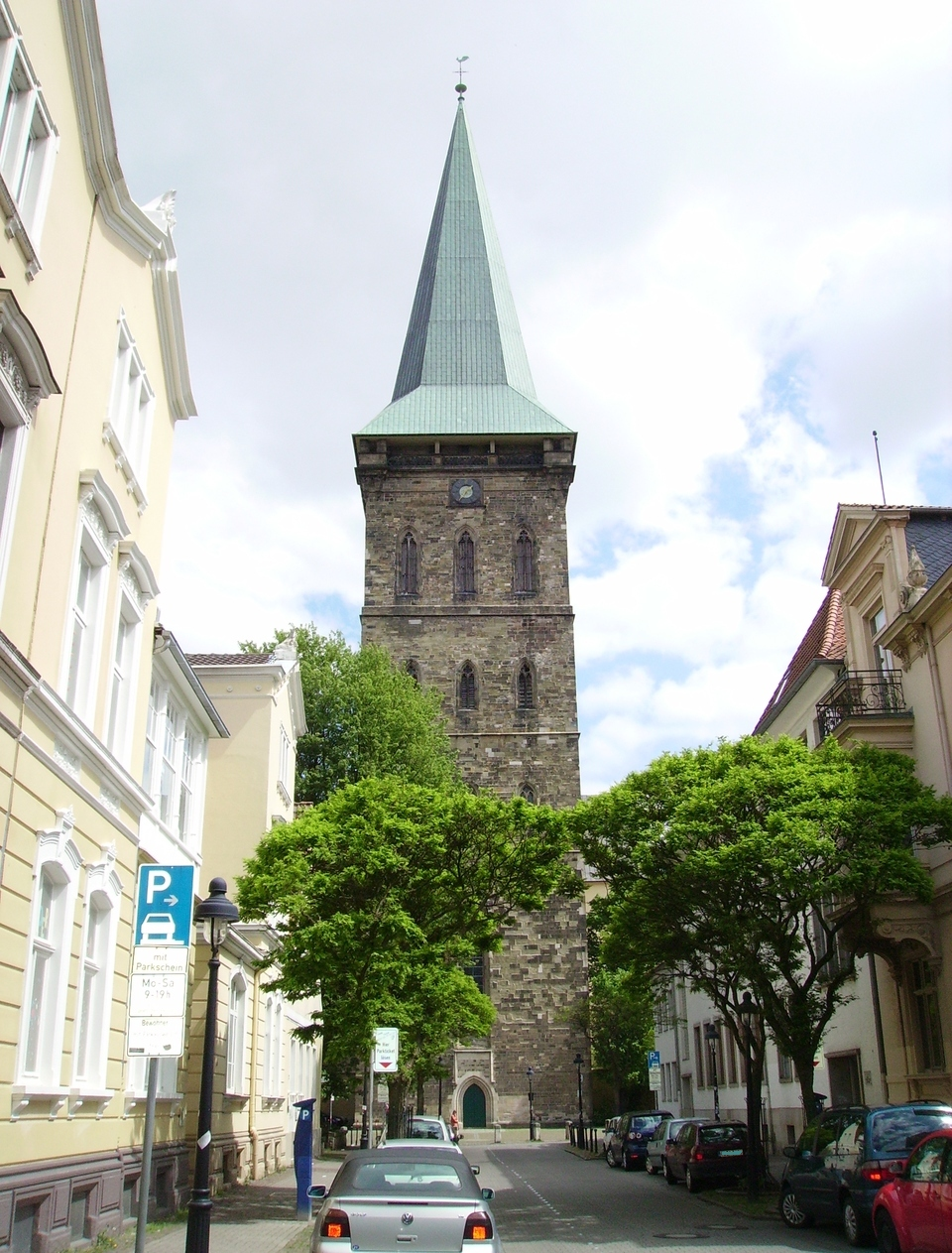
View of the St. Katharinen (St. Catherine's) church from the Katharienstraße

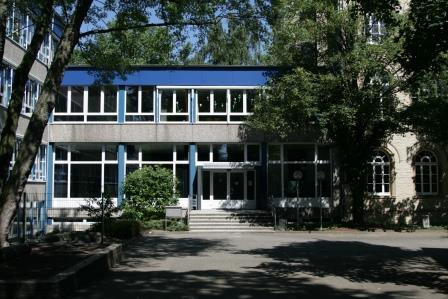
Möser-Realschule am Westerberg (Möser Westerberg Secondary School), 2013

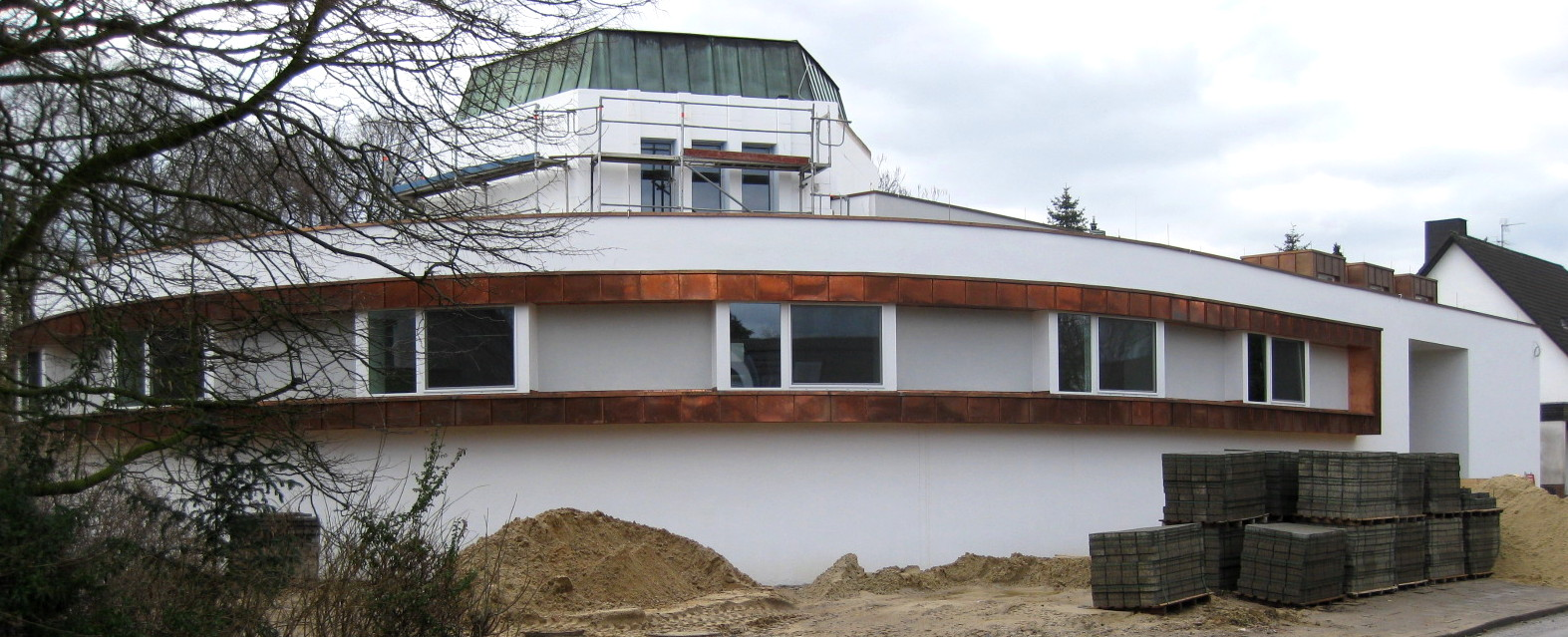
The new synagogue on the street "In der Barlage"

Weststadt (German pronunciation: [ˈvɛstˌʃtat], lit. 'west city') is a district of the city of Osnabrück with around 9,000 residents. It is located to the west of the Innenstadt (city centre) district, on which it borders along with the districts of Westerberg, Wüste and Hellern.

The Katharinenviertel makes up the eastern part of the district; with its buildings from the Gründerzeit (late 19th century period of industrialisation), green areas, traffic-free zones and cycle lanes, it is a surprisingly quiet, green zone situated between the major roads of Lotter Straße to the north and Martinistraße to the south. The convenient location of the district between the main sites of the city's university and applied sciences college have long made the Weststadt home to many student flats. The EMMA-Theater – a neo-Romanesque showcase building housing a stage owned by the Theater Osnabrück – is located in the west side of the district. This was formerly the location of the Ernst-Moritz-Arndt-Gymnasium school (from 1867 to 1980) and subsequently the Hans-Calmeyer-Orientierungsstufe (orientation school, on this site from 1980 to 2003). The Möser-Realschule am Westerberg (Möser Westerberg Secondary School) has used parts of this building since 2004. The west side of the district is also home to the Illoshöhe municipal sports centre; the Osnabrücker Turnerbund (Osnabrück Gymnastics Association) is based here and also uses parts of the buildings. There are two churches based in the Weststadt district – the evangelical Bonnuskirche and the Catholic St. Elisabeth Kirche (St. Elizabeth's Church). Services for members of the Old Catholic community are also available at the Bonnuskirche.

The street “In der Barlage” is the location of Osnabrück's synagogue, consecrated in 1969 and expanded from 2008 to 2010 at the cost of 3.6 million euros. This was due to the considerable expansion in the size of the local Jewish community since 1991 (by over 1,000 members), caused by the influx of Jewish contingent refugees from the former Soviet Union. The old synagogue was set ablaze in 1938 and torn down immediately afterwards.

Earlier the district had two separate tram lines: tram line 1 travelled from Heger Friedhof (Heger Cemetery) via Lotter Straße, Heger Tor, Rißmüllerplatz, Rathaus (Town Hall), Nikolaiort and Hauptpost to the main train station; tram line 3 travelled from Martiniplatz (Heinrich-Lübke-Platz) via Martinistraße, Arndtplatz, Neumarkt and Hauptpost to Schinkel.

== Links ==
- Quarterly information from the Referat Stadtentwicklung und Bürgerbeteiligung (Department for Urban Development and Citizen Participation), Statistics Department, 4/2008 (PDF file, 1.49 MB, in German)
- City of Osnabrück, Referat für Stadtentwicklung und Bürgerbeteiligung – statistics -, 11/2009 (PDF file, 35.40 KB, in German)
- Interessengemeinschaft Lotter Straße (Lotter Straße Interest Group)
