= Wüste =

Borough of Osnabrück, Germany

Coordinates: 52.2667°N 8.0375°E

Wüste is a district of the city of Osnabrück, Lower Saxony, Germany. With almost 14,000 residents it is the most populous district of Osnabruck. It is made up of the two subdivisions “Vordere Wüste” and “Hintere Wüste” (Wüste Superior and Wüste Inferior). Its central location and good infrastructure make it an appealing residential area.

== Geography ==
Wüste is located to the southwest of the city centre, in a valley between Kalkhügel and Westerberg. Martinistraße and Blumenhaller Weg form the district's border with the Weststadt district, located to the north. On the west side, the Bundesautobahn 30 (federal motorway nr. 30) forms the border with Hellern. The district is crossed at its most southerly point by the railway line between Münster and Osnabrück – from there the border runs along the line up to Sutthauser Straße. Afterwards it follows the street path along Rosenplatz and Kommenderiestraße up to Johannistorwall. Walking along the wall, the border is reached at the crossing of the Schlosswall and Martinistraße. At an earlier date the area was connected to the tram network on line 3, which ran from Martiniplatz (Heinrich-Lübke-Platz) to Schinkel via Arndtplatz, Neumarkt and Hauptpost.

The only substantial waterway in Wüste is the Pappelgraben, created in the 17th century. It had originally been conceived as a border line, however from 1781 to 1784 it was converted into a drainage channel (only partially successfully). Its name derives from the poplars which were planted on the north side of the channel in 1829. With the extension of the channelization and subsequent development of the Wüste, the Pappelgraben was rebuilt and extended from 1960 onwards. Today it runs to the rainwater retention basin at Hörner Bruch.

Wüste's largest lakes are its two retention basins, the Wüstensee and the Pappelsee. The Wüstensee was built on Schreberstraße during 1975 and 1976. The addition of the Pappelsee, built during the following decade along the street “Am Pappelgrabben”, saw the construction of another artificial lake with close-to-nature ambience.

== History ==
The name “Wüste” refers to the former state of today's district – initially it was the scene of an Ice Age fen, described as “wöst” (uninhabitable) in Low German. Plans were made during the 18th century to use the area for ranching cattle, however its natural state made it ill-suited for this purpose. Not even the construction of the Pappelgraben managed to drain the area properly. The removal of Osnabrück's fortifications from 1843 onwards led to an increase in the demand for plots of land. This led to an extensive draining of the Wüste using earth masses from the old city walls. From the start of the 20th century to the 1960s household waste, rubble, slag and ashes were used for this purpose.

In the early 1990s, construction work revealed the presence of harmful substances. Investigations showed that about 270 hectares of land were polluted by PAH, lead, cadmium, barium, copper and zinc. Out of 1,700 residential sites surveyed, 218 exceeded the test value set by the Bundesbodenschutzverordnung (Federal Soil Protection and Contaminated Sites Ordnance). As a result, Wüste became known as one of Germany's largest contaminated sites. From 2006 to 2008, the sanitation of over 70 plots of land took place over three phases. The municipal administration of Osnabrück covered the resulting costs; however the owners of the properties had to pay for the restoration of their gardens.

== Infrastructure ==
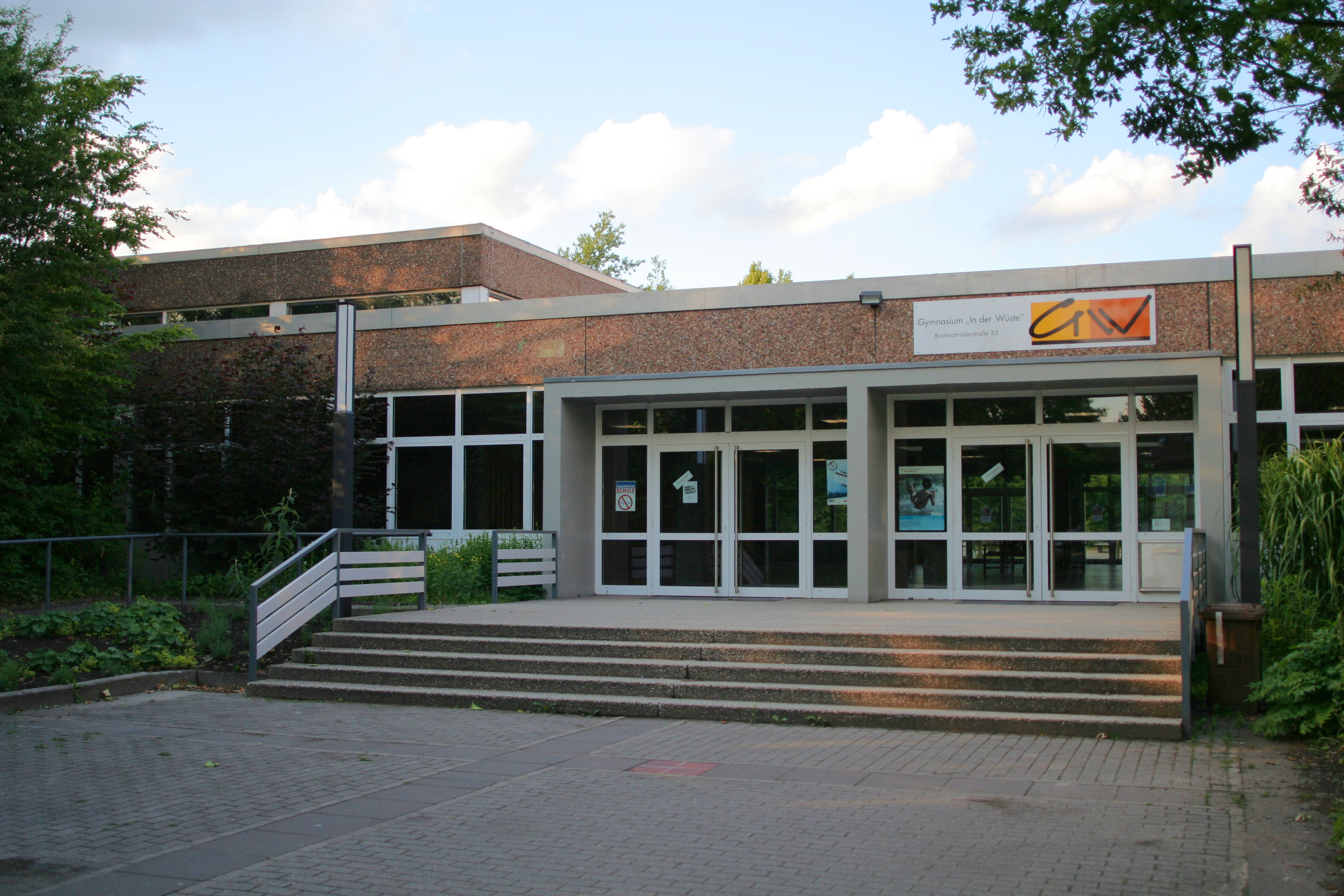
Gymnasium “In der Wüste” (Wüste Grammar School)

The district has a school centre made up of a primary school, middle school and the Gymnasium “In der Wüste” – convenient public transport links result in them being attended by many pupils from the surrounding region. The district is served by bus lines 51 and 91/92 along with the N9 night bus.

Wüste's education centre for the hearing-impaired is a state-funded special school, enabling pupils with auditive difficulties to obtain their Mittlere Reife (secondary school) qualifications. The local churches are the Christuskirche (Methodist) and the Freikirche (Baptist).

== Anecdotal information ==
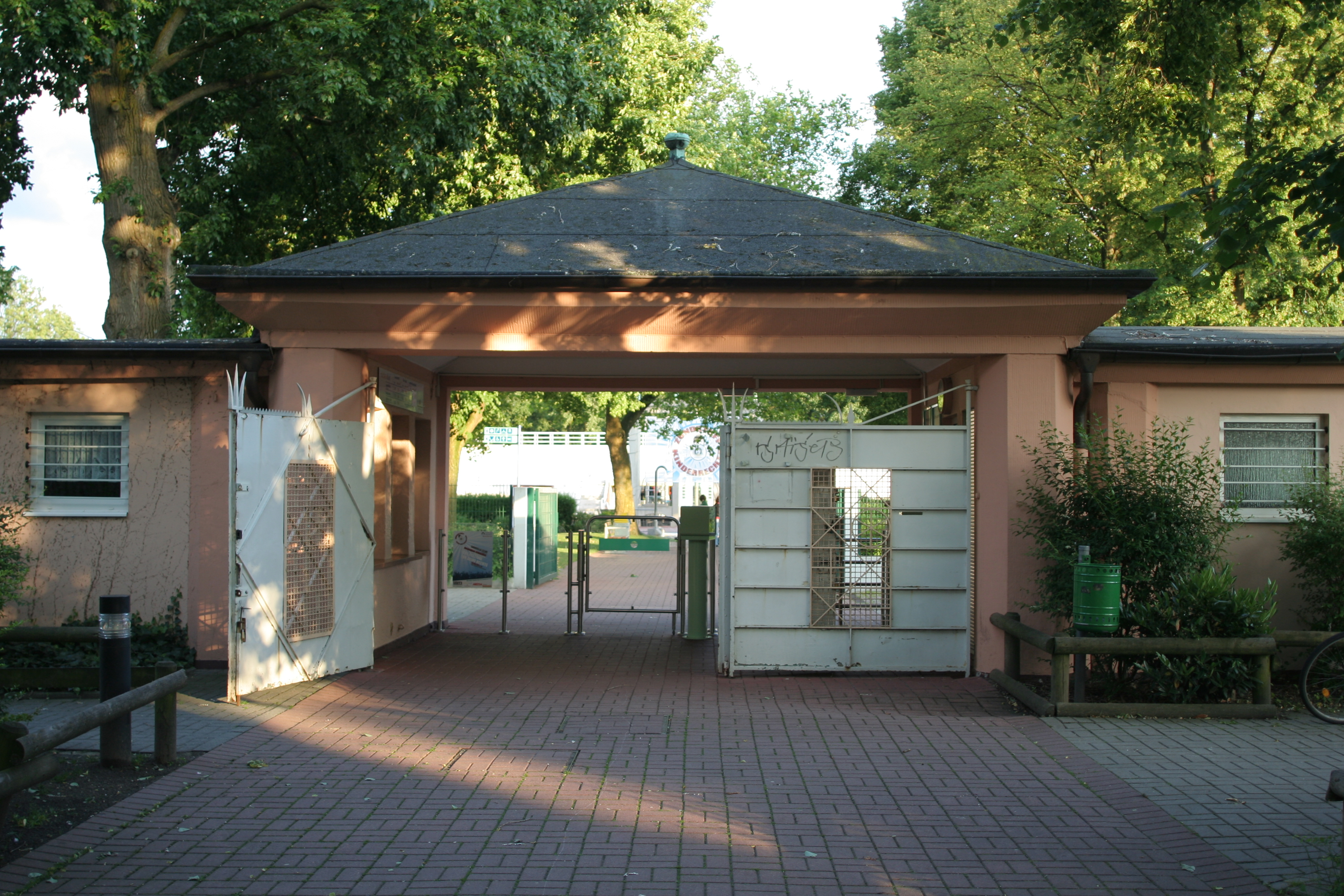
Entrance to the Moskaubad

- The magazine “Der Spiegel” once published a notice from the Neue Osnabrücker Zeitung in its “Hohlspiegel” section (featuring clumsy or paradoxical wording in other publications) with the following title, not unusual to locals’ ears: “Für unsere Mutter suchen wir eine ruhige, sonnige Wohnung in der Wüste” (“We are searching for a quiet, sunny apartment in the wasteland for our mother”; one of the other meanings of “Wüste” being “wasteland”).
- The unusual saying “Moskau liegt in der Wüste” (Moscow is in Wüste) has raised a smile among non-Osnabrückers. It refers to the Moskaubad, which opened in 1926 and functions today as a combined open-air and indoor swimming pool; colloquially it is usually referred to as simply “Moskau”.
- The Moskaubad is referenced in another humorous local claim – that Osnabrück is the largest city in the world because it stretches all the way from Wüste to Moscow.
- Some of the district's residents refer to themselves jokingly as “Wüstlinge” (libertines).

== Links ==
- Webpage about the former landfill in Wüste
- Quarterly information from the Referat Stadtentwicklung und Bürgerbeteiligung (Department for Urban Development and Citizen Participation), Statistics department, 4/2008 (PDF file, 1.49 MB, in German)
- City of Osnabrück, Referat für Stadtentwicklung und Bürgerbeteiligung – statistics -, 11/2009 (PDF file, 35.40 KB, in German)
