= Weststadt =

Weststadt (German: west(ern) city) may refer to:

- Weststadt (Karlsruhe), a district of Karlsruhe
- Weststadt (Braunschweig), a district of Braunschweig
- Weststadt (Osnabrück district), a district of Osnabrück
