= Atterheide Airfield =

Atterheide Airfield Flugplatz Osnabrück-Atterheide
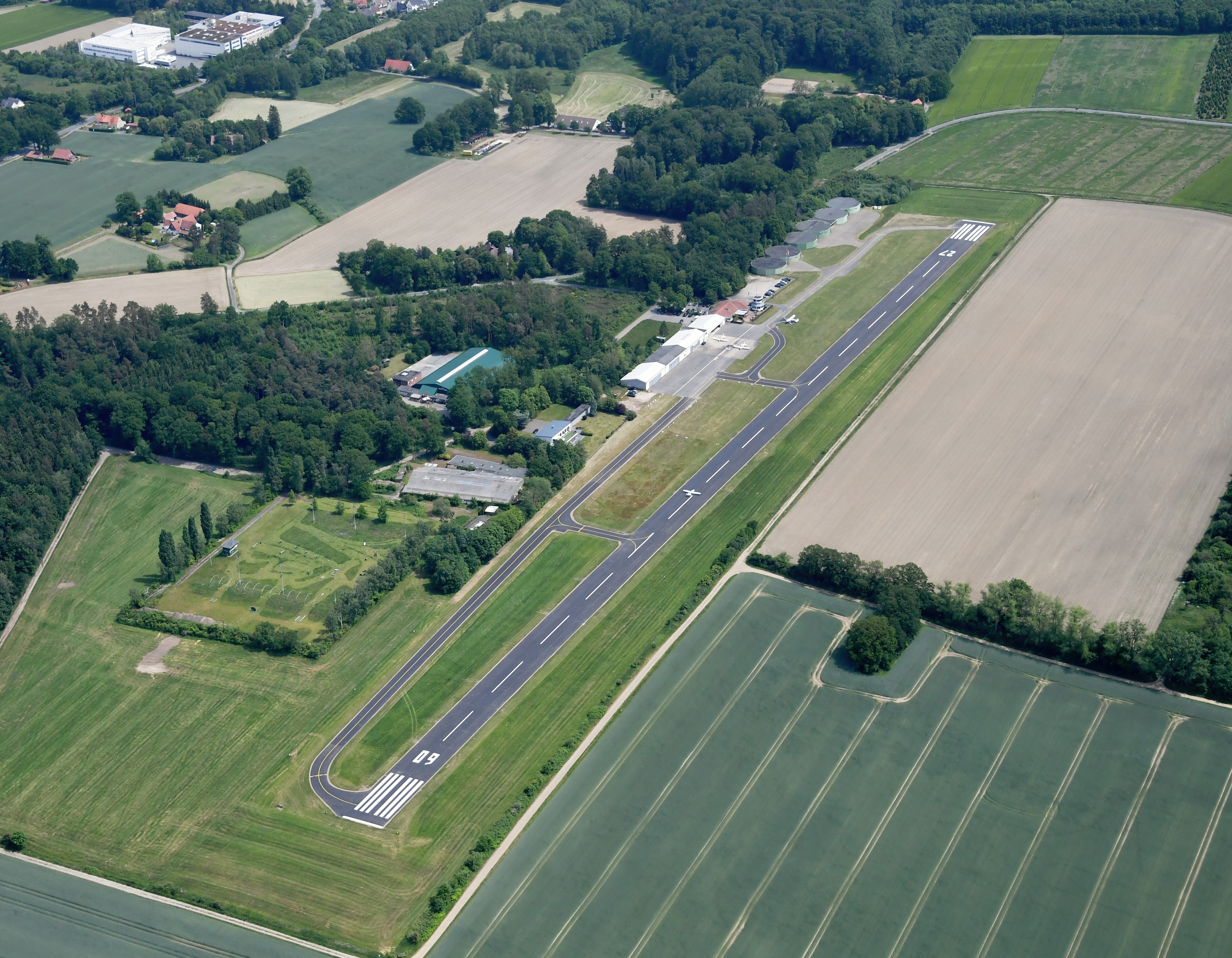
- IATA: none; ICAO: EDWO

Summary
- Airport type: Public
- Owner/Operator: Aero-Club Osnabrück e. V.
- Serves: Osnabrück, Germany
- Location: Atter, Germany
- Built: 1959
- Occupants: 1
- Elevation AMSL: 285 ft / 87 m
- Coordinates: 52°17′11.6″N 7°58′11.35″E
- Website: atterheide.de

Map
- Location within Lower Saxony

Runways
| Direction | Length | | Surface |
| Direction | ft | m | Surface |
|---|---|---|---|
| 09/27 | | 800 | asphalt |

The Atterheide Airfield is an airfield in the Atter district of Osnabrück, a short distance from the border between the states of Lower Saxony and North Rhine-Westphalia.

== History ==
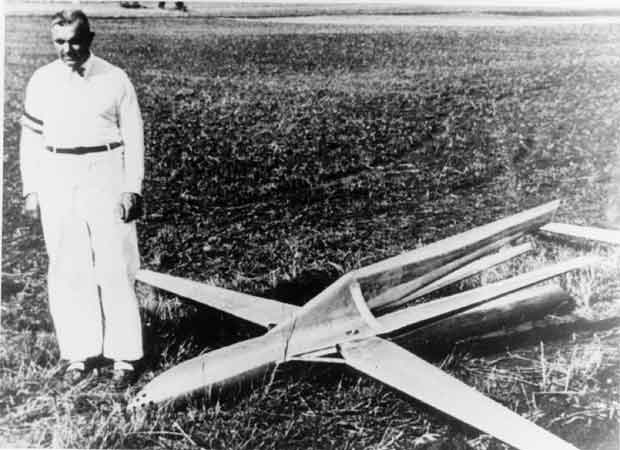
Reinhold Tiling next to a rocket on Atterheide

As early as 1912, the aerobatic pilot Gustav Tweer and other aviation pioneers of Osnabrück were allowed to use the Atter heathlands (Atterheide) for flying. From the mid-1920s, the Atterheide was used by glider pilots of the Osnabrücker Verein für Luftfahrt (OVfL, Osnabrück Association for Aviation), as Osnabrück's main airfield at the time in the Netter Heide was not suitable for glider take-offs. The take-offs took place on a slightly sloping hillside to the south. On 21 August 1932, the engineer Reinhold Tiling held a flight day here to present his self-developed rockets with 4000 spectators. After the closure of the airfield in Haste in 1935, the use of the airfield in Atter by glider and model pilots increased even more. Flight operations ceased in 1938.

After the Second World War, when civil powered flight operations were permitted again in Germany from 1955, 28 enthusiastic motor pilots founded the Aero-Club Osnabrück in December 1955. Initially, the airfield in Vörden near Bramsche was used. However, since this was to be used for military purposes from 1959, the Aero-Club moved to the Atterheide. The site was available to be leased from the noble family Ostman von der Leye, who inhabited the nearby estate Gut Leye. When the site had been cleared and levelled, the first test take-offs and landings with motorised aircraft took place in 1958 on the Atterheide. After receiving approval in January 1959, the airfield was officially opened on 25 April 1959.

In the early years, flight operations were carried out with simple means: the 500-metre long runway running in a west–east direction had a grass surface and the air traffic control and the aero club were based in a wooden hut. In the 1960s, up to 40,000 visitors attended large-scale airshows with aerobatic performances, parachutists and even touch-and-go manoeuvres by jet aircraft. The airfield facilities were further expanded through the club members' own efforts without public funding. After the construction of the first hangars, the runway was extended to 800 metres and asphalted in 1980. In 1986 the tower was opened, followed by a new clubhouse in 1990.

== Facility ==
The asphalt runway runs in an east–west direction (90°/270°) and is 800 metres long. The airfield houses a flight school as well as a catering business. The airfield is a so-called commercial airfield, i.e. a commissioner for air traffic control is employed full-time. The airfield can be approached all year round by aircraft up to 5.7 t gross weight and helicopters. Between 9000 and 11,000 aircraft movements take place over the course of a year.

== Gallery ==
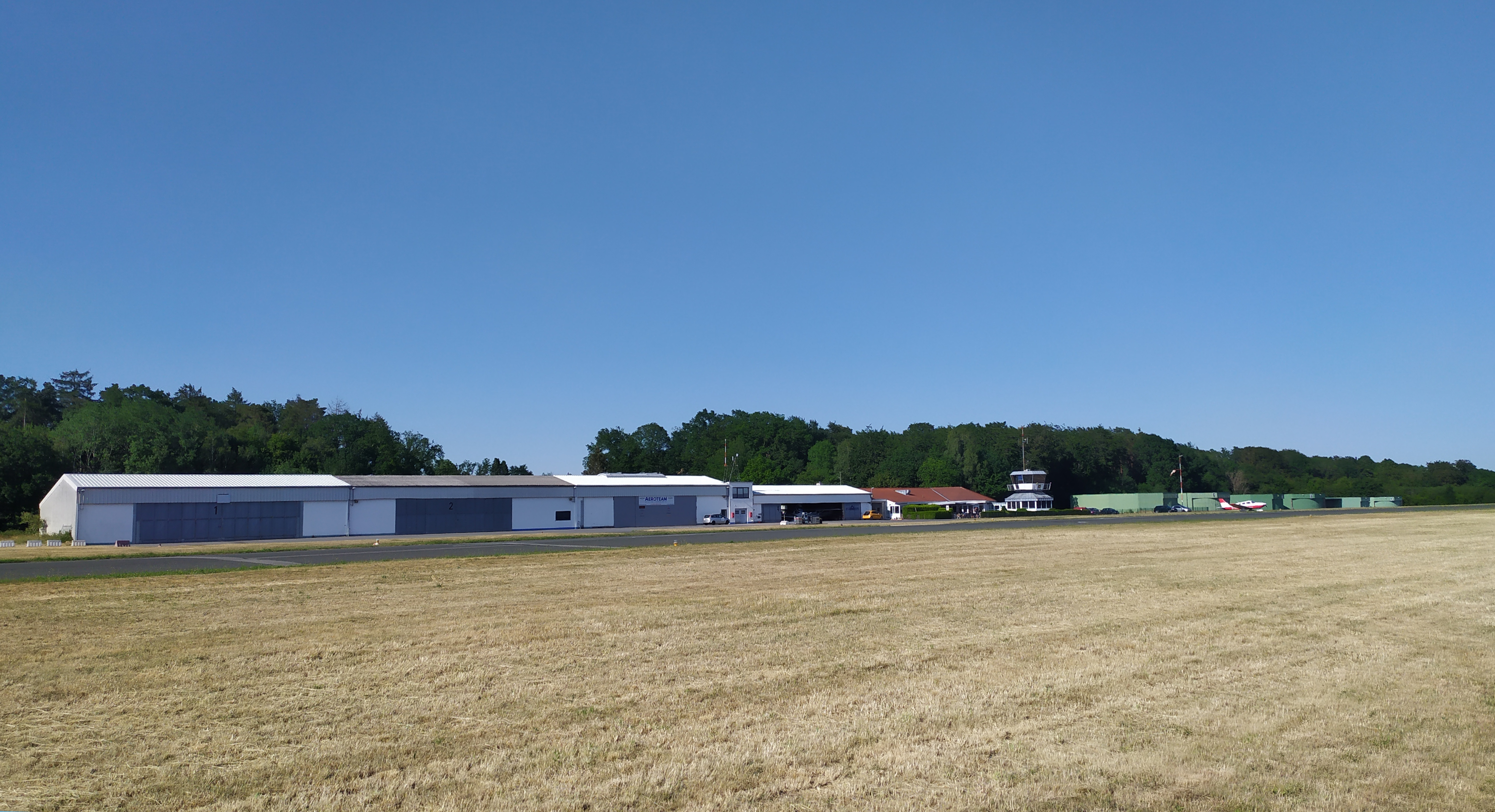
Osnabrück-Atterheide airfield seen from the other side

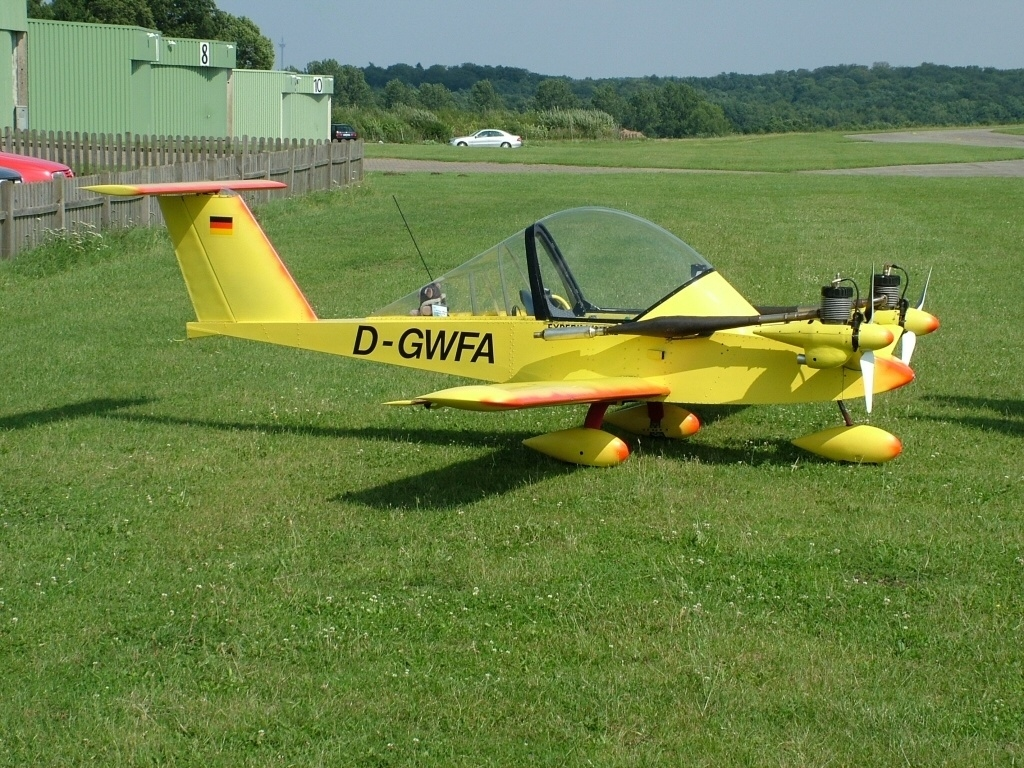
Colomban MC-15 at Osnabrück-Atterheide airfield.

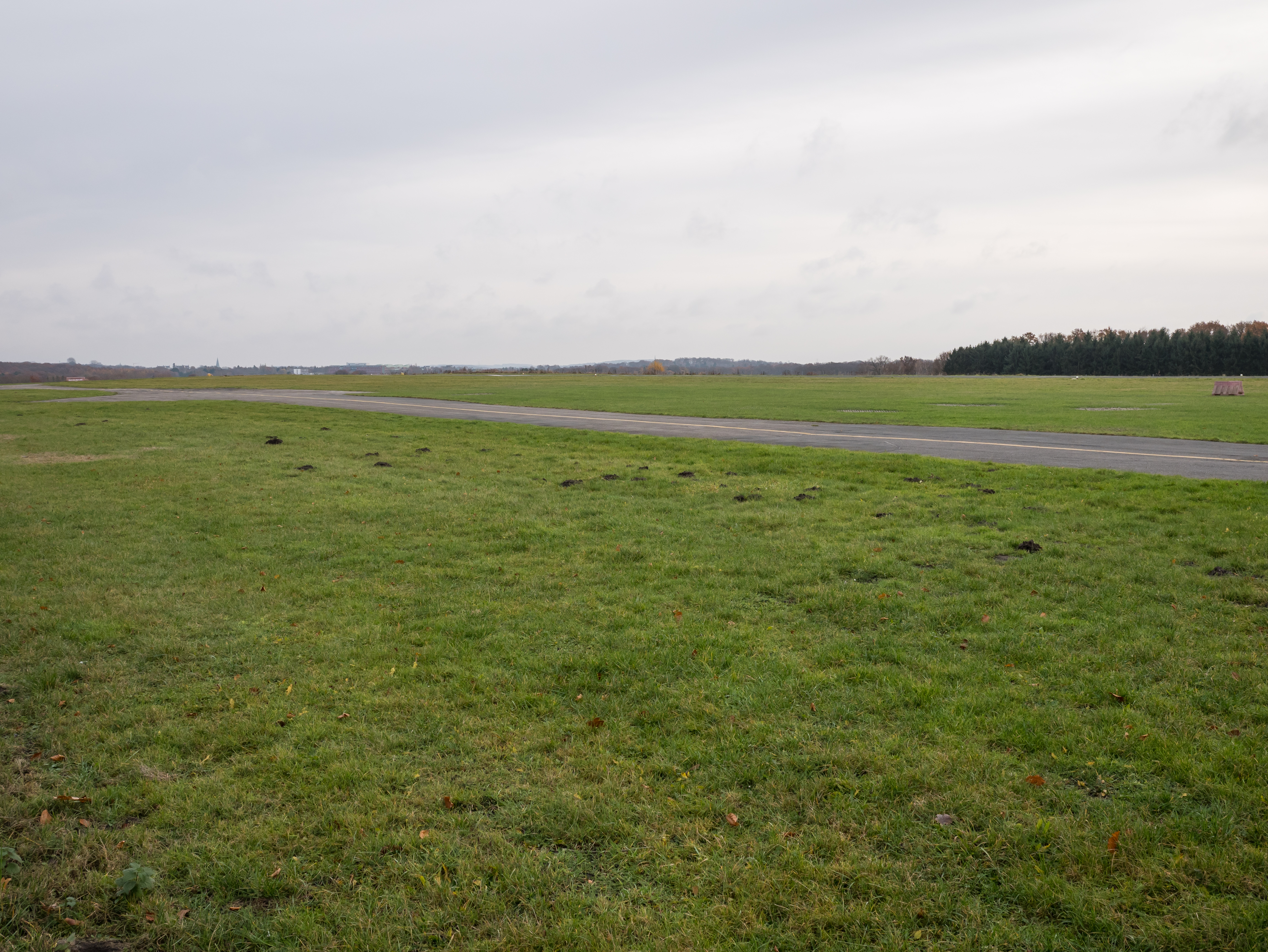
Tarmac

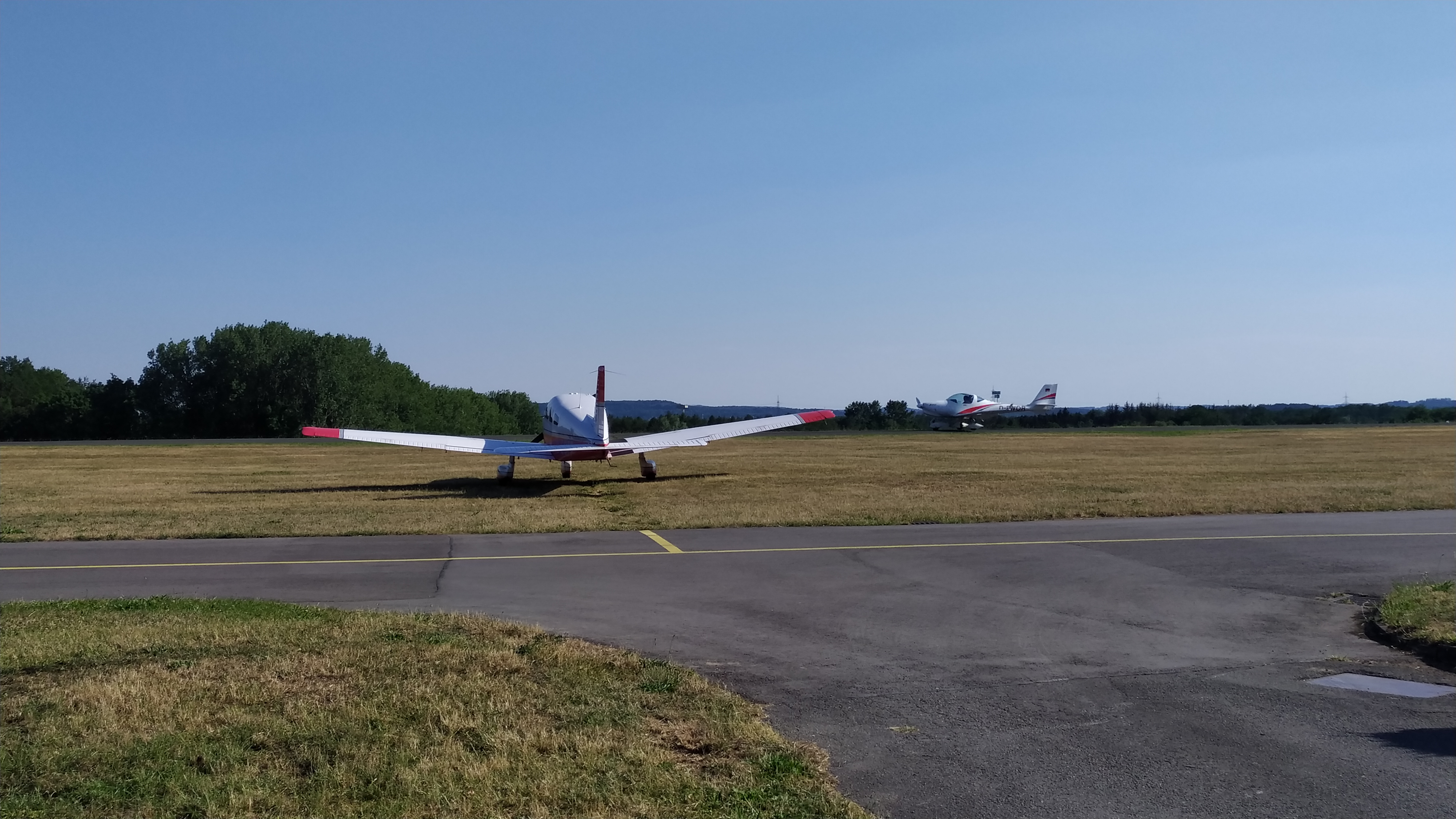
Osnabrück-Atterheide airfield with two small aircraft
