= Atter (Osnabrück) =

District of Osnabrück, Lower Saxony, Germany

Coordinates: 52.2917°N 7.9508°E

Atter is a district in the west of Osnabrück, Lower Saxony, Germany, with a population of 4,135 residents across 2,030 households (as of late 2008). Covering an area of 1,075.9 hectares, it was incorporated into the city of Osnabrück on 1 July 1972. The districts on which it borders are Eversburg (NE), Westerberg (SE), and Hellern (S). On the west it borders on the municipality of Lotte in North Rhine-Westphalia; Autobahn 1 also passes through this area. The border with Westerberg runs through the Rubbenbruchsee, a local recreation area.

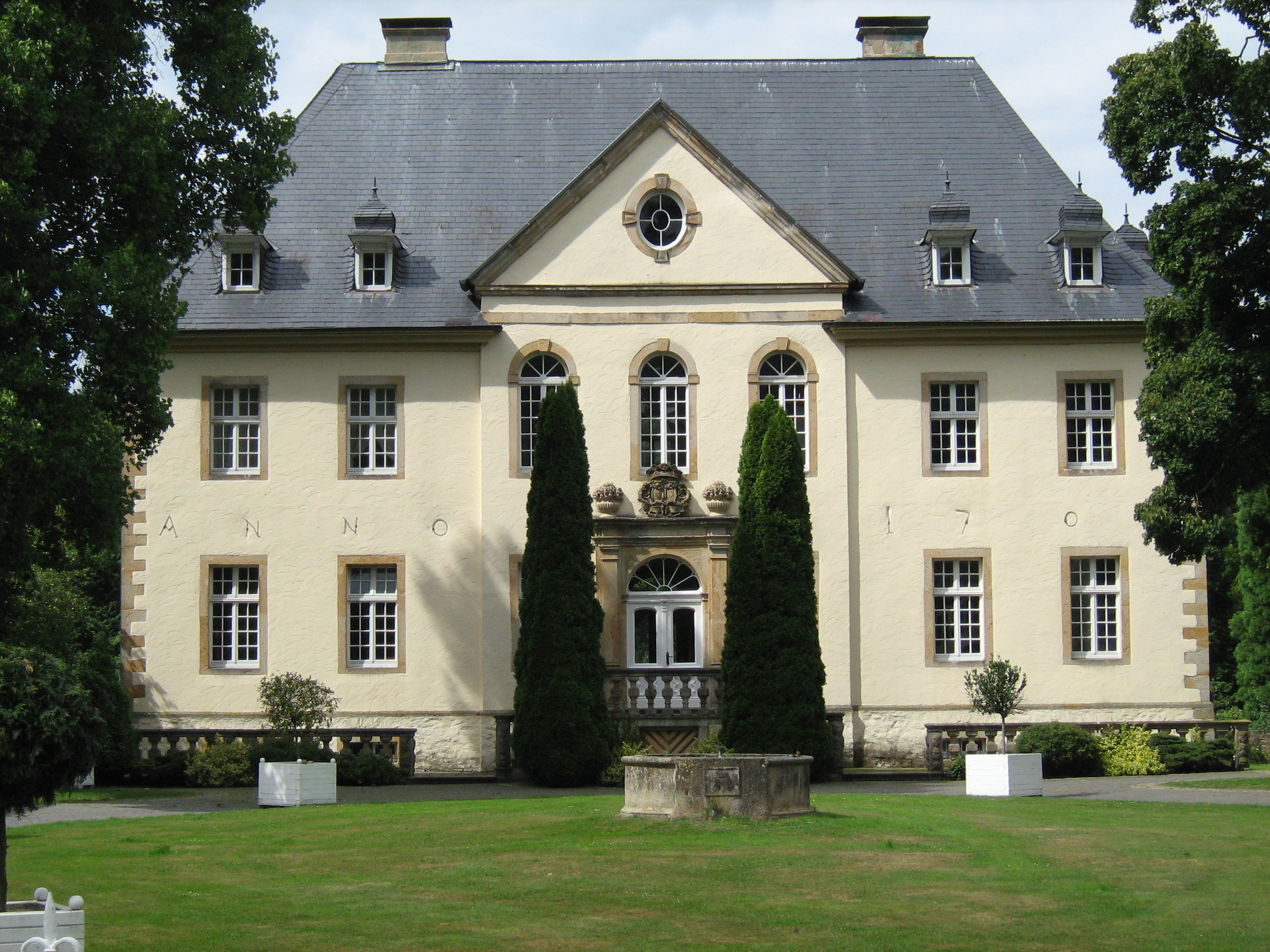
Gut Leye (Leye estate)

Atter is home to the Attersee, the Protestant Stephanuskirche and Gut Leye (the Leye estate) which has its own Roman Catholic chapel. The Reformed Protestant Atterkirche was closed down due to financial difficulties. Atter’s cemetery is the smallest in Osnabrück, covering an area of around 10,000 m². Situated in the Leyer Holz north of the district’s centre, it was originally built in 1913.

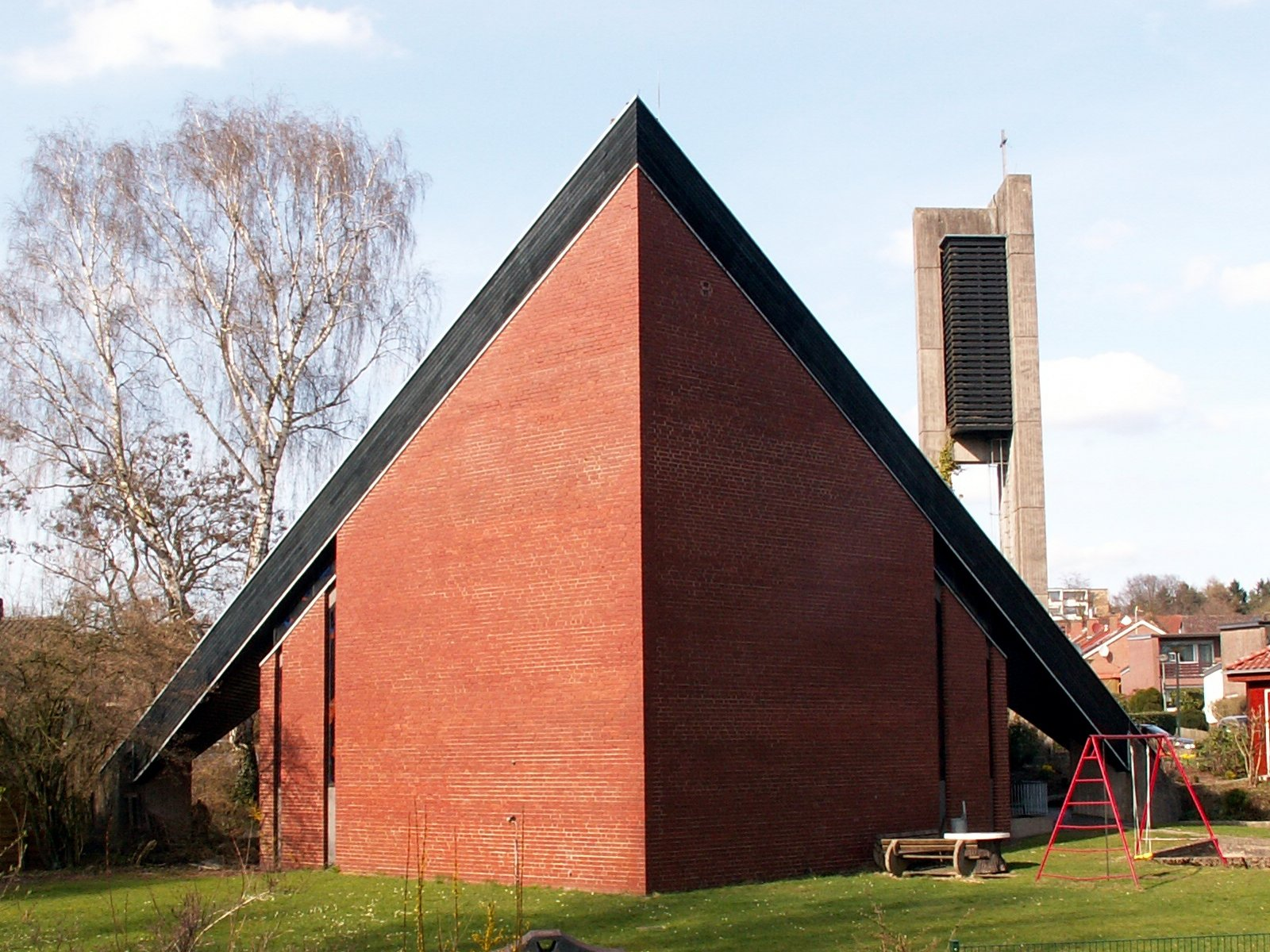
Stephanuskirche

The former site of the Quebec Barracks covers an area of 370,410 m². Decommissioned in 2008, it used to serve as the headquarters of the British Army in Germany (formerly the British Army of the Rhine. 107 housing units in Atter – mostly built during the 1950s and 1960s – were used by relatives of British soldiers in the area.

== Transport ==
Atter is situated on Bundesautobahn 1. Located in the district is the “Verkehrslandeplatz Atterheide” (Atterheide airfield), the only airfield in the city.

The Lotte railway station (on the Löhne-Rheine line) used to be located on the periphery of the district. In 1949 Atter was connected to Osnabrück’s first-ever O-bus line, with ran (with accompanying tram line) from Rißmüllerplatz to Eversburg-Atter via Natruper Straße; a partial lane ran towards Eversburg-Büren. Today Atter is served by city buses.
