= Kalkhügel =

District of Osnabrück, Lower Saxony, Germany

Coordinates: 52.2594°N 8.0433°E

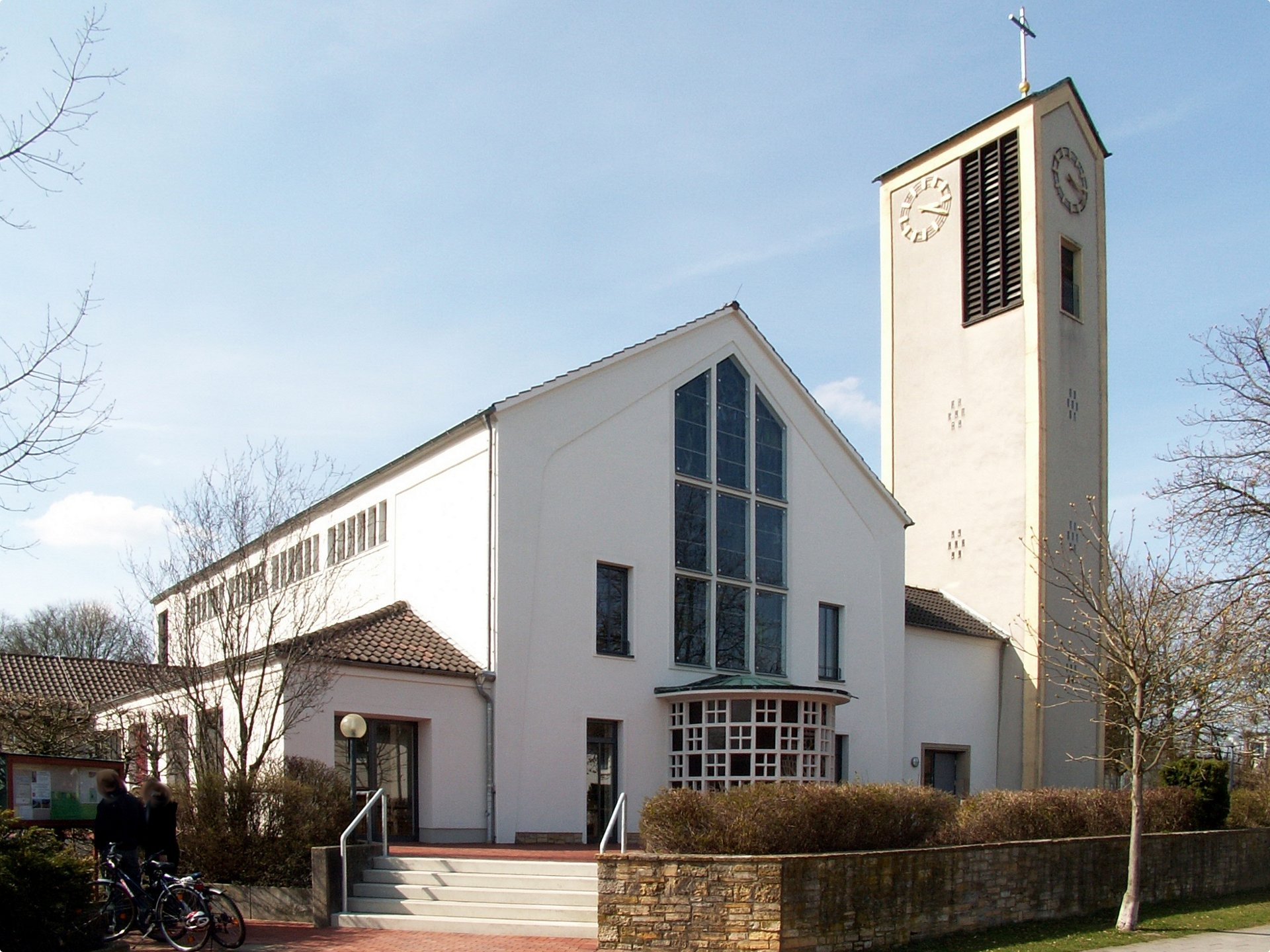
St. Pius (Catholic church)

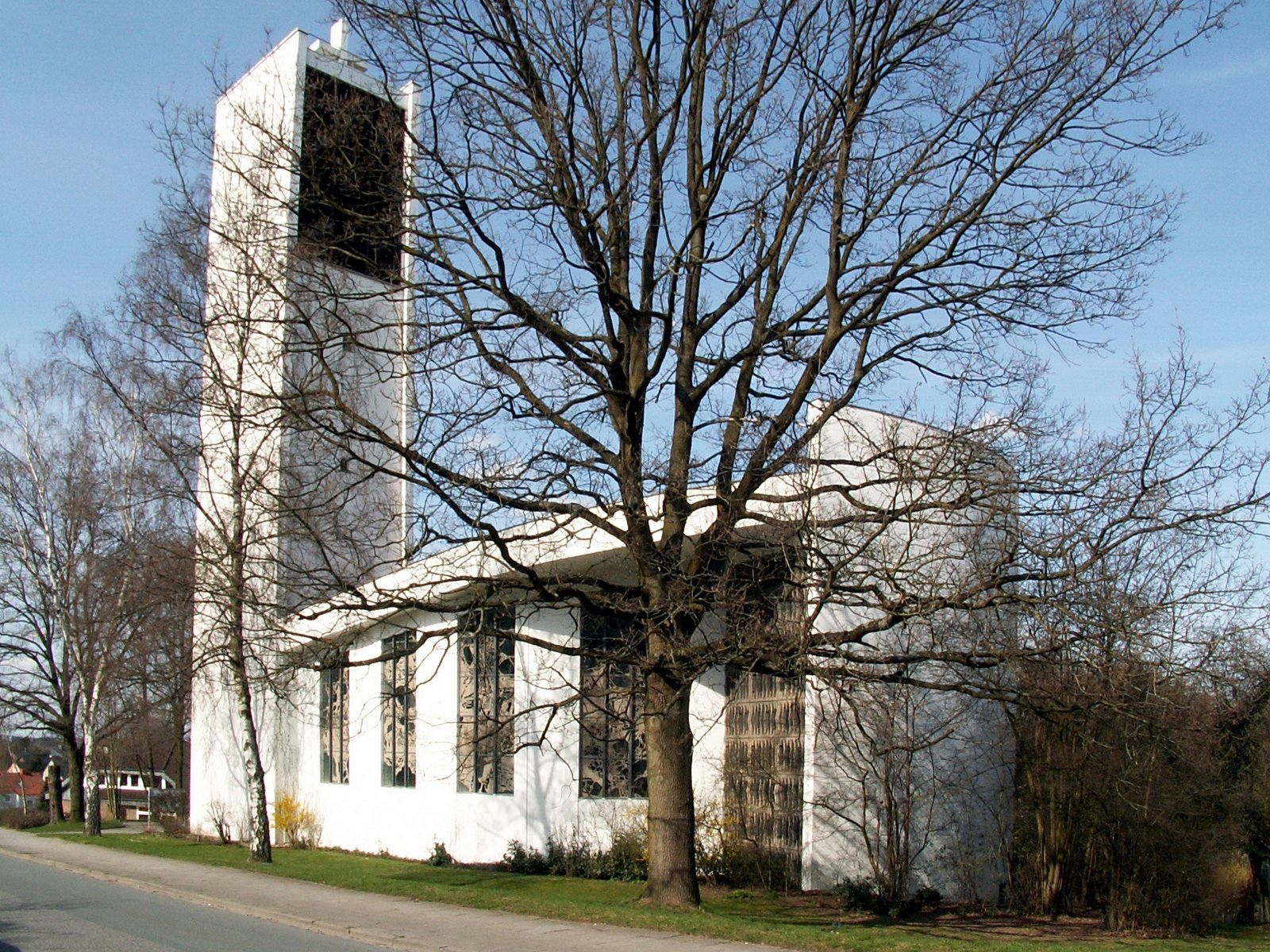
Melanchthonkirche (Protestant church)

Kalkhügel is a district of Osnabrück, Germany with a population of roughly 5,900 residents. It is home to both a Protestant and a Catholic church (the Melanchthonkirche and St. Pius Kirche respectively). There is also a school centre (Schulzentrum) located in the district.

== Location ==
The Kalkhügel district is situated in the south-west of Osnabrück. It borders on the districts of Wüste, Innenstadt, Schölerberg, Nahne, Sutthausen and Hellern (in a clockwise direction, starting from 12 o’clock).

== Literature ==
Haubrock, O’Brien, Der Luftschutzstollen am Kalkhügel – Ein ehemaliger Luftschutzbunker in Osnabrück (ISBN 978-3-8448-1154-4)

== Links ==
- City of Osnabrück, Referat für Stadtentwicklung und Bürgerbeteiligung – statistics -, 4/2008 (PDF file, 1.49 MB)
- City of Osnabrück, Referat für Stadtentwicklung und Bürgerbeteiligung – statistics -, 11/2009 (PDF file, 35.4 KB)
