= Moskaubad =

Public swimming pool in Wüste, Osnabrück, Germany

Coordinates: 52.2637°N 8.0366°E

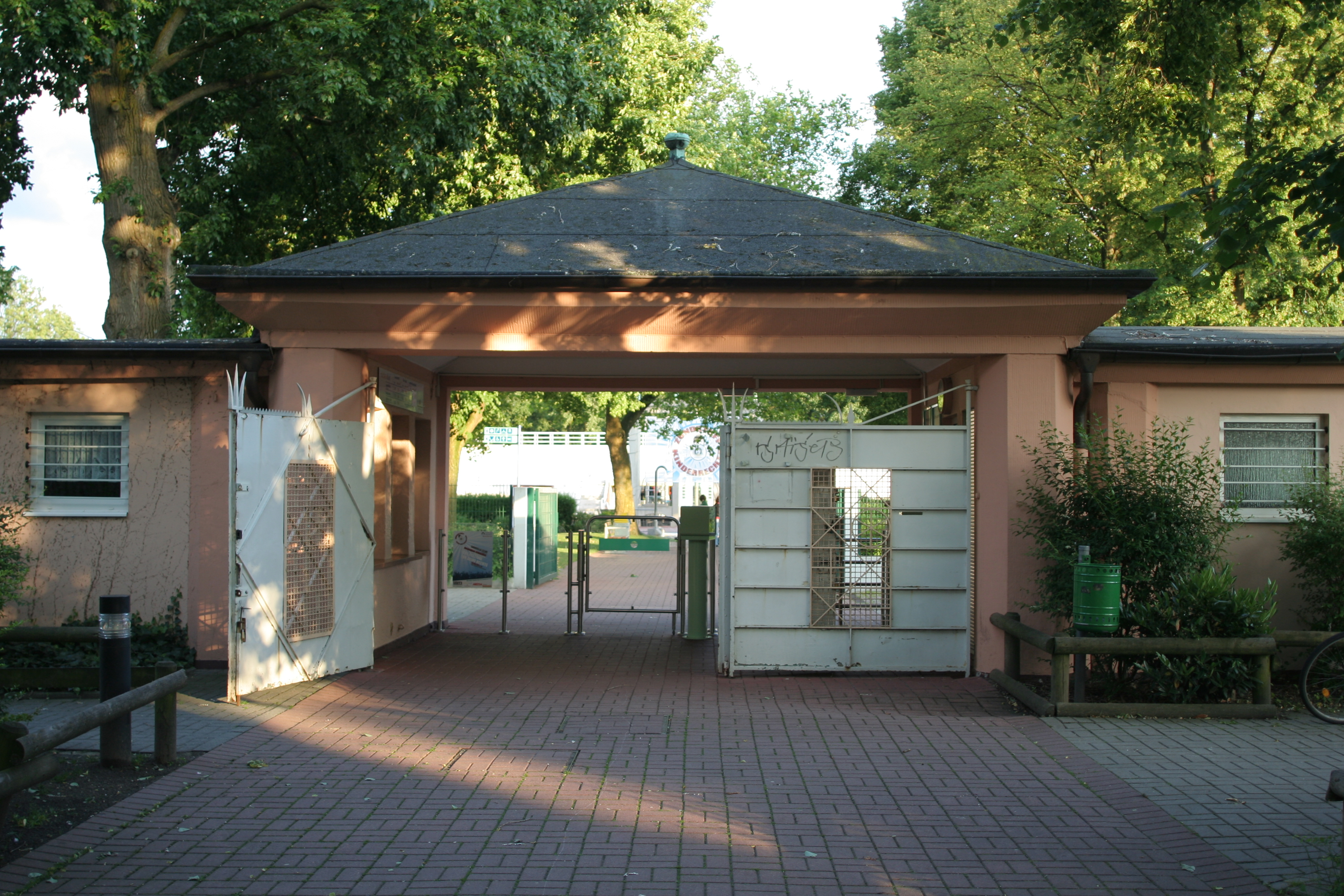
Moskaubad, entrance area

The Moskaubad (English: Moscow Baths) is a public swimming pool in the Wüste district of Osnabrück, Germany. It was first opened in 1926 as an outdoor swimming pool under the name of “Moskau”. In 1933 its name was changed to the “Neustädter Freibad” (New Town Outdoor Pool). In the late 1990s the baths underwent major renovation. Thus, rebuilding work added to them, among other things, a small indoor pool; they were also given back their old name. The outdoor and indoor swimming complex is visited by roughly 250,000 people each year.

== History ==
Planning for the swimming pool began in 1925. Its central element was the tribune, running parallel to the 100m-long pool. Separate baths for women, families and non-swimmers were also added. One notable attraction was the 10m-high diving tower. A heated pool was situated behind the tribune. After only a few months of building work, the outdoor pool's opening ceremony took place on 7 August 1926. At that time it was one of the city's first recreational facilities. The public took to it quickly; barely four weeks later, on 5 September 1926, it had already received 10,000 guests.

The towers at the edges of the tribune were finished later. In 1933 the pool was given the name of “Neustädter Freibad”. Prior to the 1936 Summer Olympics in Berlin the swimming pool was divided into two 25-metre pools and one 50-metre pool. Up until World War II the swimming pool was used as an ice rink on cold winter days. The baths suffered severe damage during the war, primarily from bombs aimed at the nearby railway line – an aerial mine caused the diving tower to collapse. After the war, the British military government had the baths restored; from August 1947 they were usable again.

The increasingly dilapidated and dated condition of the baths led to considerable renovation works in the 1990s. After a lengthy construction period, an extensively redesigned pool complex was reopened to the public in 1997 – the arrangement of the baths had been changed and the ten-meter diving tower replaced with springboards 3m and 1m high. Alongside the pools featured other attractions such as a 76m-long waterslide, a wave pool and a rain grotto. A small swimming hall, with a 25m-long pool and a year-round outdoor pool, opened in 1998. During the construction of the swimming hall a bomb from World War II was discovered; it was defused without incident.

== Origins of Name ==
Views differ as to the origins of the name “Moskau” (Moscow). One popular view states that it came from a 19th-century coffee house bearing this name, located on the same site as the later swimming pool. Some also think there might be a connection to Napoleon’s retreat from Russia in 1812. Another possible origin is the Low German term for “moosige Aue” (mossy meadow). The name of the baths is not believed to have any connection to the fact that Russian POWs had to perform labour in the Wüste district during World War I. Local people continue to use the phrase “going to/into Moscow” when referring to visiting the pool.
