= Osnabrück University of Applied Sciences =

University in Osnabrück, Germany

Coordinates: 52.2832°N 8.0251°E

- Hochschule Osnabrück
- Type: Public law foundation
- Established: 1971 (foundation status since 2003)
- Budget: €108 million
- President: Alexander Schmehmann
- Total staff: 1,413
- Students: 13,071 (Winter 2024/25)
- Location: Osnabrück, Germany
- Campus: Urban
- Website: https://www.hs-osnabrueck.de

Osnabrück University of Applied Sciences (German: Hochschule Osnabrück, formerly Fachhochschule Osnabrück) is a university of applied science in Lower Saxony, whose administrative centre is in Osnabrück. It has existed in its current form since 2003, having originally opened in 1971. Some of its departments can be traced back to engineering schools and other colleges operating as early as the 1950s.

Since 1 January 2003, the Osnabrück University of Applied Sciences has been a foundation with legal capacity under public law. The university has sites in the Osnabrück districts of Westerberg and Haste along with another site in Lingen in Emsland, which is due to be expanded under the terms of the Hochschulpakt 2020 (University Pact 2020) programme. The lecture halls, seminar rooms and laboratories belonging to the schools of Engineering and Computer Science and Business Management and Social Sciences are located in Westerberg. The School of Agricultural Sciences and Landscape Architecture and its teaching buildings, laboratories and greenhouses are located in the Haste district, in the middle of a 5-hectare park on the verge of the Wiehen Hills, they are a hill range in North Rhine-Westphalia and Lower Saxony in Germany.

== History ==
Osnabrück University of Applied Sciences was established in 1971 as a merger of several predecessor institutions, with the Department of Economics being founded at this time. The university’s origins can be traced back to the following educational establishments:

- The School of Engineering and Computer Science evolved from the Staatliche Ingenieurschule Osnabrück (Osnabrück State Engineering School), which was founded in 1962.
- The School of Agricultural Sciences and Landscape Architecture has its roots in the Höhere Landbauschule (Higher Agricultural School) in Quakenbrück, founded in 1936. This institution relocated to Osnabrück in 1952 and was later integrated into the Fachhochschule Osnabrück.
- The Institute of Music originated from the Städtisches Konservatorium Osnabrück (Osnabrück Public Music Academy), which was founded in 1919. It became part of the Fachhochschule in 1996.

In 1987 the Fachhochschule established West Germany’s first ever professorship of nursing science.

From 1995 to 2000, the Fachhochschule was one of the model higher education institutions featured in the initiative “Modellvorhaben für eine Erprobung der globalen Steuerung von Hochschulhaushalten in Niedersachsen” (Model Projects for a Trial of Global Management of University Budgets in Lower Saxony), whose results have since been integrated into legislation concerning higher education in the state.

The university's transfer over to the foundation set up in its name ("Stiftung Fachhochschule Osnabrück") in 2003 brought about various organizational changes, such as the establishment of a foundation council (chaired by Helga Schuchardt). By 2006, the new foundation of the Fachhochschule had become one of the largest public law foundations in Germany by expenditure.

The new building on the Caprivi Campus in Westerberg was dedicated in 2004; the School of Business Management and Social Sciences has been using the barracks grounds since 1998. That year also saw the start of the German Network for Quality Development in Care, whose offices are located at the Osnabrück University of Applied Sciences and whose role is to develop care and national expert standards in this sector.

When Lower Saxony's new Higher Education Act came into force in September 2010, the "Fachhochschule Osnabrück" was renamed the "Hochschule Osnabrück". In addition, the winter semester of 2010/11 saw the number of students at the University of Applied Sciences surpass 10,000.

In 2011, the School of Management, Culture and Technology was established as part of a new organisational superstructure at the Lingen site; it arose from the former schools for Communication and Society, Management and Technology and also the Department for Dual Courses (a cooperative venture with the Emsland Vocational Academy). The new Lingen campus was opened in October 2012, following the extension of halls 1 and 2 of the former repair workshop in Lingen.

During the winter semester of 2011/12, WiSo introduced its new Applied Economics (BA) course – the first of its kind in Germany. In February 2012, the cooperative research college "FamiLE – Familiengesundheit im Lebensverlauf" (Family Health in the Course of Life) was founded in conjunction with the Witten/Herdecke University.

On 19 April 2013, the groundbreaking for the extension of the University of Applied Science (and the University of Osnabrück) into Westerberg took place. Lower Saxony's Ministry of Education and Culture invested approximately 23 million euro in the lecture theatre; for the entire new campus, roughly 80 million euro worth of further investment is expected.

== Departments ==
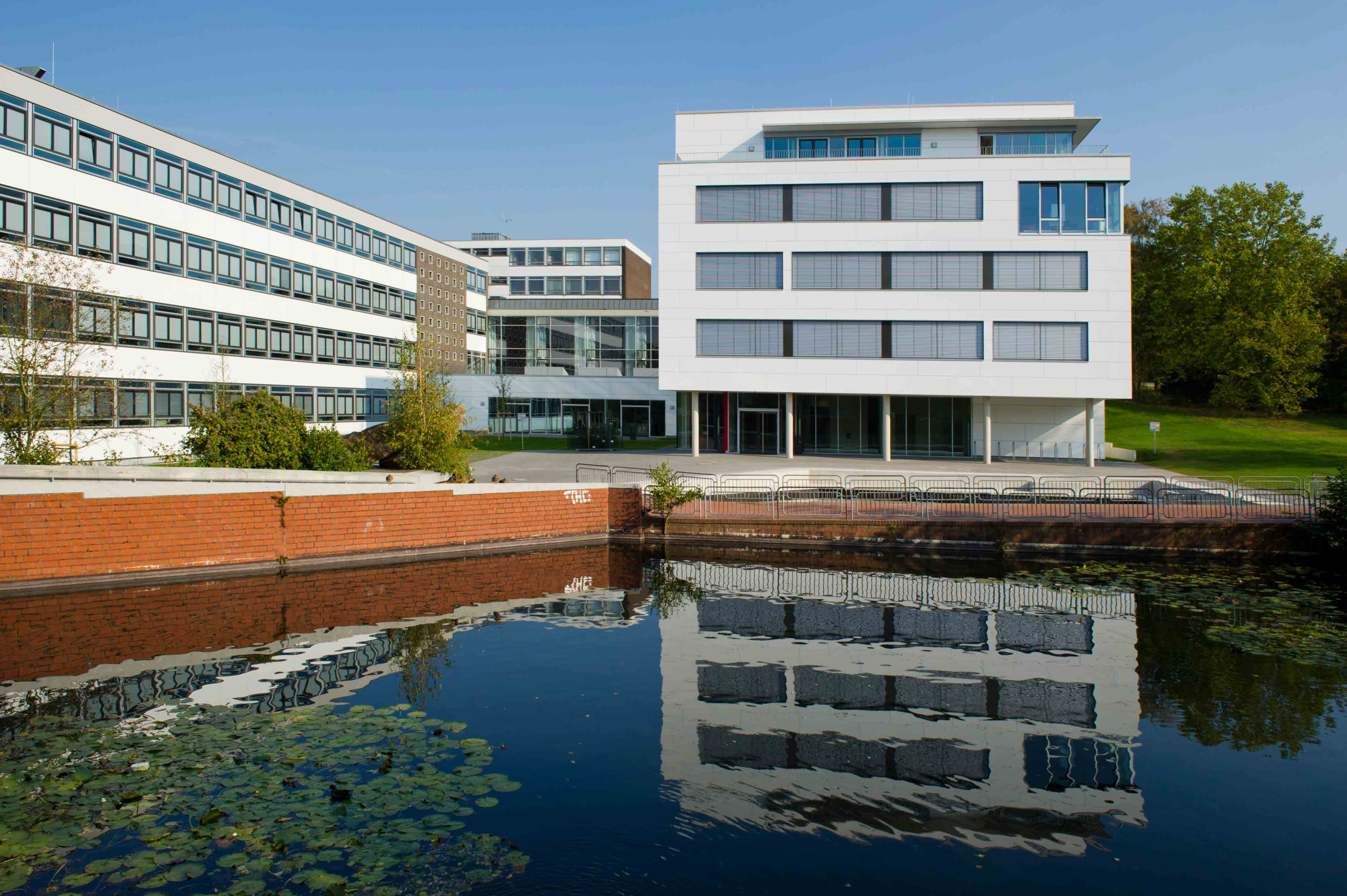
AF building, Albrechtstraße

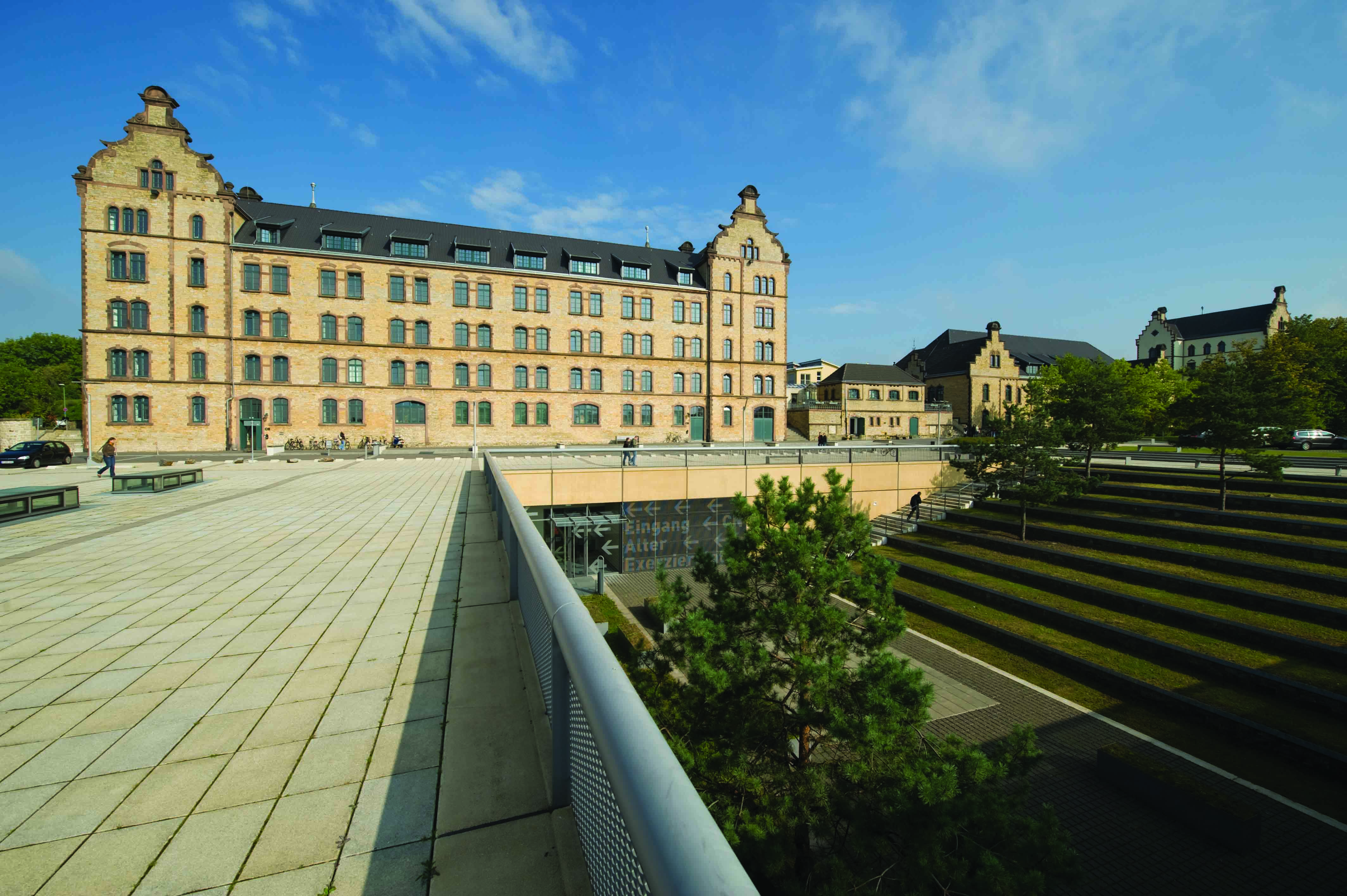
CB building, Caprivistraße

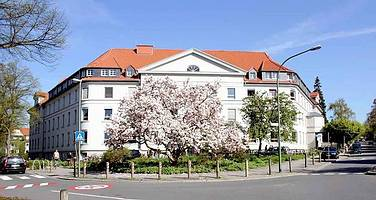
Institute of Music, Caprivistraße

The university is made up of four faculties and the Institute of Music.

- Faculty of Agricultural Sciences and Landscape Architecture (AuL)
- Faculty of Engineering and Computer Science (IuI)
- Faculty of Business Management and Social Sciences (WiSo)
- Faculty of Management, Culture and Technology (MKT, Lingen campus)
- Institute of Music (IfM)

== Research ==
A number of core areas for internal research were allocated for 2012 to focus the university's research activities and encourage more successful projects with greater potential for innovation. At present the university has 12 main research areas:

- Forschungszentrum Energiewirtschaft Energierecht (Research Centre for the Energy Industry and Energy Law)
- KOMOBAR – Decision Strategies and Communicative Structures for Cooperative Mobile Work Machines in Agriculture
- Mobile Communications
- Applied Research Focus – Automated Systems
- Intelligent Sensor Systems
- Precision Farming als Instrument der interdisziplinären potenzialorientierten Landnutzung (Precision Farming as an Instrument for Interdisciplinary, Potential-Oriented Land Use)
- Optimisation of Business Processes in the Logistics Chain
- Patient- and Client-oriented Concepts for the Systemisation of Nursing Practice
- Development and Implementation of Expert Standards in Care
- Reproductive Health for Women and Families
- Konzeptionierung und Einführung einer praxisintegrierenden elektronischen Lernbasis (Conception and Introduction of Practice-Integrated, Electronic Learning Methods)
- SafeConnect

From 2012 to 2016, the Volkswagen Foundation agreed to give Osnabrück University of Applied Sciences around 1 million euro to assist with the soil science research project "Rüwola" in cooperation with the HAWK University of Hildesheim/Holzminden/Göttingen. In December 2011, eight research applications from the University of Applied Sciences for grants from the European Regional Development Fund (with a total value of roughly 1 million euro) were approved.

Through cooperative initiatives such as the „FamiLe – Familiengesundheit im Lebensverlauf" research college, students are given the opportunity to undertake doctoral studies following the completion of their courses.

The Waldhof test operation of the School of Agricultural Sciences and Landscape Architecture, based in Wallenhorst, is the home of Competence Center ISOBUS e.V., a registered association promoting technological development, quicker practical farming and also the international implementation of ISOBUS, an agricultural communication system.

== International collaborations ==
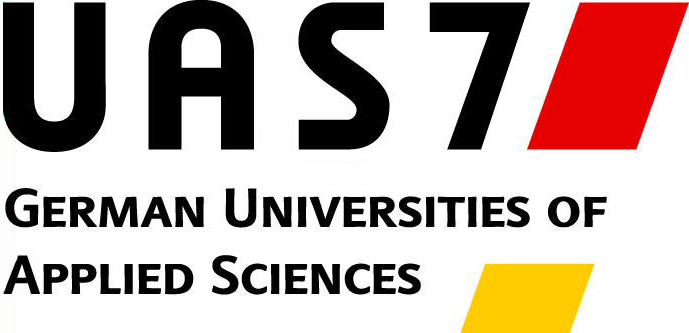
UAS7

Most of the university's schools offer courses with a European or international basis, along with a year abroad at one of the institution's many partner universities.

In cooperation with Buckinghamshire New University in the United Kingdom, the School of Business Management and Social Sciences offers an MBA programme. It is a three-year part-time course with attendance periods and enables students to acquire understanding of management and leadership abilities. Lecturers for this course consist of academics from partner universities along with business experts. Graduates will receive a double diploma: one which awards them the title of Master of Business Administration from both Bucks New and Osnabrück University of Applied Sciences. The British partner university is located in High Wycombe in Buckinghamshire.

Osnabrück University of Applied Sciences also collaborates with universities in China; alongside Hefei University, an international study course in logistics management (called "LOGinCHINA") is offered – this is based on Osnabrück's Business Administration and Management (B.A.) course. Along with Münster's university of applied sciences and the Saxion Hogeschool in Enschede, Netherlands, an MBA course in International Supply Chain Management is offered. In cooperation with Beijing Normal University, the Danube University Krems and the University of Tampere, an Erasmus+ Joint master's degree (Master in Research and Innovation in Higher Education) was introduced in 2012.

The university is one of seven members of the German university federation "Alliance for Excellence" (UAS7).

== Study conditions and events ==
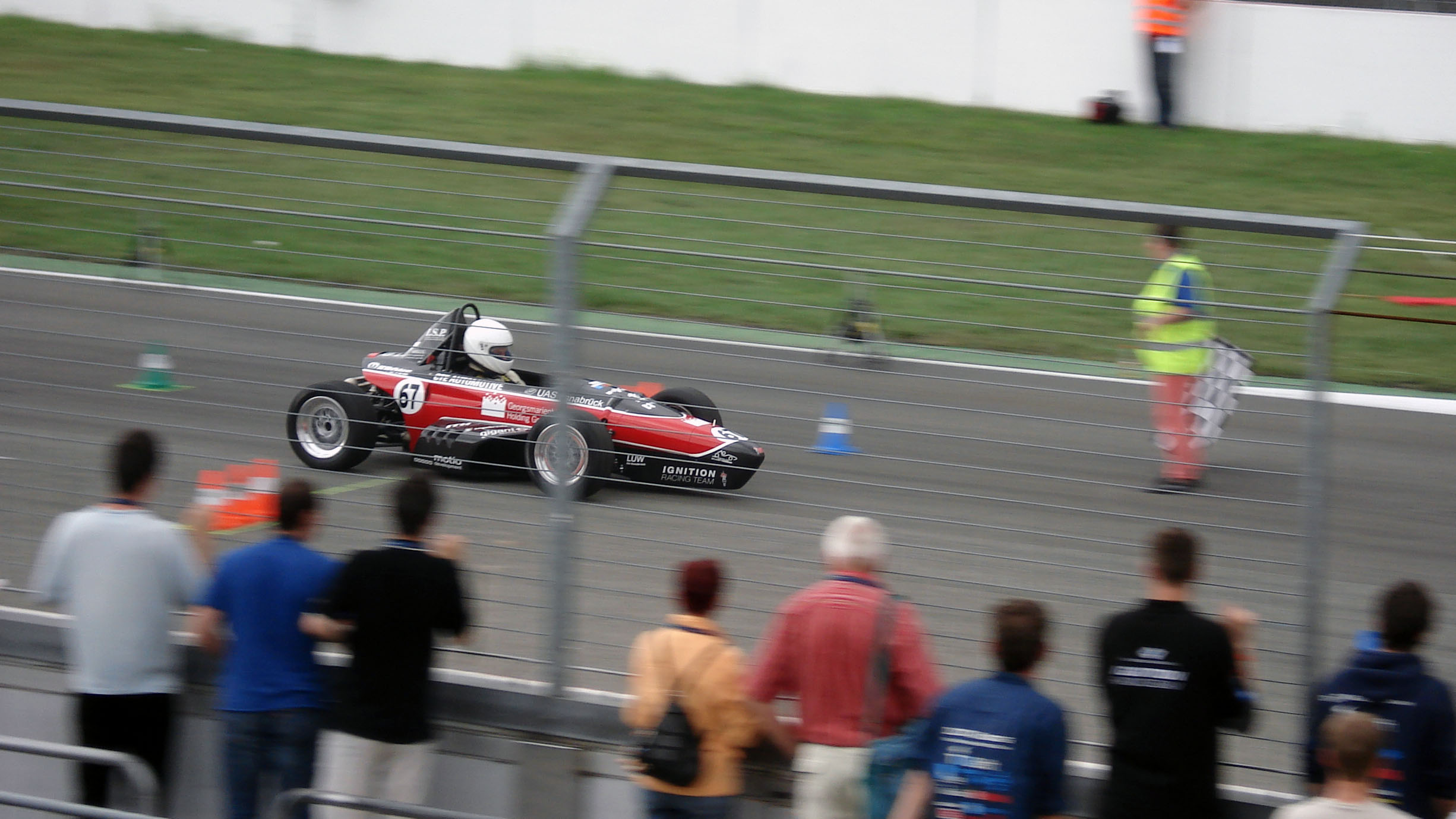
Racecar IR08 of the university team at the Formula Student Germany competition, 2008

At Osnabrück University of Applied Sciences, the student-to-lecturer ratio is relatively favorable. The campus features several green spaces, and while it includes numerous older buildings, many of these have been renovated, with ongoing improvements.

The university also hosts the Terrassenfest music festival, held annually in April and May, which attracts attendees beyond the student community.

In the 2005 CHE rankings, the Business Law program was recognized among the top courses, and in the 2007 CHE Bachelor's rankings, two programs offered by the School of Business Management and Social Sciences received high ratings.

Osnabrück University of Applied Sciences participates in the Formula Student Germany racing competition, with an interdisciplinary team, known as the "Ignition Racing Team," consisting of around 40 students from the Schools of Engineering and Computer Science and Business Management and Social Sciences.

== Personalities and alumni ==
=== Notable teachers and former teachers ===
- Kurt Bodewig, honorary professor in traffic logistics
- Helge Breloer, lectureship in auditing and determining wood value
- Andreas Frey
- Heinz Rudolf Kunze
- Roland Pröll
- Florian Weber

=== Notable graduates ===
- Reinhold Hilbers, member of the Landtag of Lower Saxony
- Anne Ross, singer
- Jendrik Sigwart, singer
- Rainer Spiering, member of the Bundestag
- Aloys Wobben, electrical engineer, former owner and manager of Enercon

== The university in popular media ==
In the (Charlotte) Lindholm-centred 2007 Tatort episode "Das namenlose Mädchen" (The Nameless Girl), which takes place in Osnabrück, the murder victim attends a course at the university. Filming took place in August and September 2006 at various locations including Haste, the University of Osnabrück and also at a student residence. The Caprivi campus of the School of Business Msnagement and Social Sciences is also featured in the 2008 made-for-TV film "Vertraute Angst" (Familiar Fear) from ARD, in which it is used as the setting for a psychiatric clinic.

In 2007, filming of the 2008 documentary drama "Remarque – Sein Weg zum Ruhm" (Remarque – His Path to Fame) took place at the Caprivi campus; it revolves around the author Erich Maria Remarque, who underwent military training at the Caprivi barracks in Osnabrück.

== See also ==
- List of universities in Germany
- University of Osnabruck

== Links ==
- Osnabrück University of Applied Sciences – official website
- Osnabrück University of Applied Sciences – Students’ Union website
