= Westerberg (Osnabrück district) =

District of Osnabrück, Lower Saxony, Germany

Coordinates: 52.2806°N 8.0250°E

Westerberg is a district of Osnabrück, Lower Saxony, Germany, with roughly 8,700 residents. It is situated in the west of the city between Lotter Straße and Pagenstecherstraße. The districts bordering it are Eversburg, Hafen, Sonnenhügel, Innenstadt, Weststadt, Hellern and Atter. The border with Atter passes through the Rubbenbruchsee, part of a large local recreation area.

As well as parts of the University of Osnabrück and the Osnabrück University of Applied Sciences, the Klinikum Osnabrück (Osnabrück Clinical Centre) and the Paracelsus clinic are also located in Westerberg. There were also a number of British bases situated here, giving the district a considerable proportion of British families – these bases were closed in 2010 and today remain ready for conversion. The Osnabrücker Aktien Brauerei (with a workforce of around 220) used to brew its nationally acclaimed beer in Westerberg.

One of the main places of interest here is the university's botanical garden, formerly a quarry. The Art Nouveau-style Protestant Bergkirche is located in this district, along with the Markuskirche (also Protestant), the Catholic St. Barbara Kirche and an independent Protestant church.

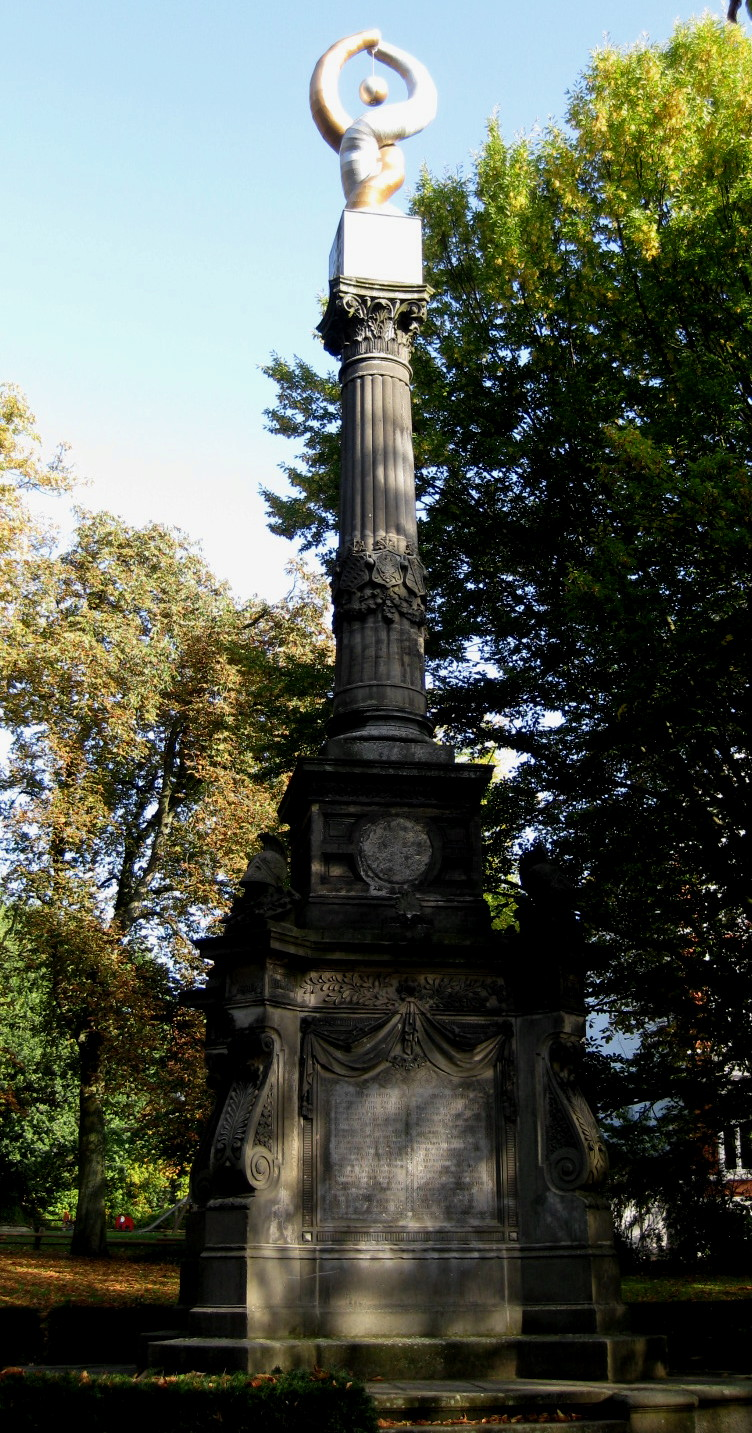
Monument at Straßburger Platz

Merely a few minutes’ walk from the rest of the city – which effectively surrounds it – the Westerberg acts as a local recreation area for the populace. Unusually for a large town, a farm – the Gut Musenburg – remains active right in the middle of the city.

The barracks, which date back to the German Empire and which are today used by the University of Applied Sciences, continued to be used by a Scottish regiment of the British Army of the Rhine until a few years ago.

Large parts of this district are amongst Osnabrück's most desired residential areas with the highest property prices. There is a colloquial expression - “die Leute von Westerberg” (people from Westerberg) – which is taken a synonym for the “particularly influential members of the social elite”. Local politics frequently see accusations of preferential treatment for Westerberg being made. Westerberg residents respond by asserting that the city administration – according to statistics – invests much more money in the other districts.

The monument at Straßburger Platz honours the soldiers from Osnabrück who fell during the Franco-German War of 1870–71. It was first erected in Neumarkt in 1880; in 1928 it was relocated to Westerberg. Pupils from the Osnabrücker Ratsgymnasium designed a sculpture – “Die schützende Torsion” (The Protective Torsion) – symbolising Franco-German friendship.

== Transportation ==
There used to be a connection to tram line 1, which went from Heger Friedhof through Lotter Straße, Heger Tor, Rißmüllerplatz, Rathaus, Nikolaiort and Hauptpost to the Hauptbahnhof. Today the district is regularly served by city buses; lines 21, 22, 31, R31, 32 and 33 travel to Westerberg.

== Security ==
The city centre location of the volunteer fire department in Osnabrück provides, in particular, protective fire security, along with general support in Westerberg and additional services.

== Links ==
- City of Osnabrück, Referat für Stadtentwicklung und Bürgerbeteiligung – statistics -, 11/2009 (PDF file, 35.40 KB, in German)
