= Osnabrück University =

German university

Coordinates: 52.273°N 8.042°E

- Universität Osnabrück
- Type: Public
- Established: 1974
- Affiliations: EUA
- Budget: € 141.1 million
- President: Susanne Menzel-Riedl
- Academic staff: 981
- Administrative staff: 734
- Students: 14,000
- Location: Osnabrück, Lower Saxony, Germany
- Campus: Urban
- Website: www.uni-osnabrueck.de

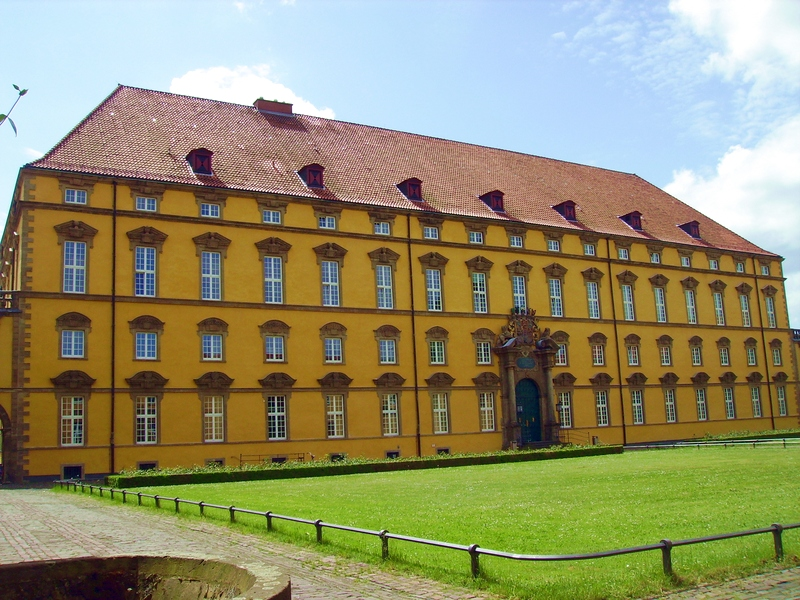
Osnabrück Castle, main building of the university, view from the inner court

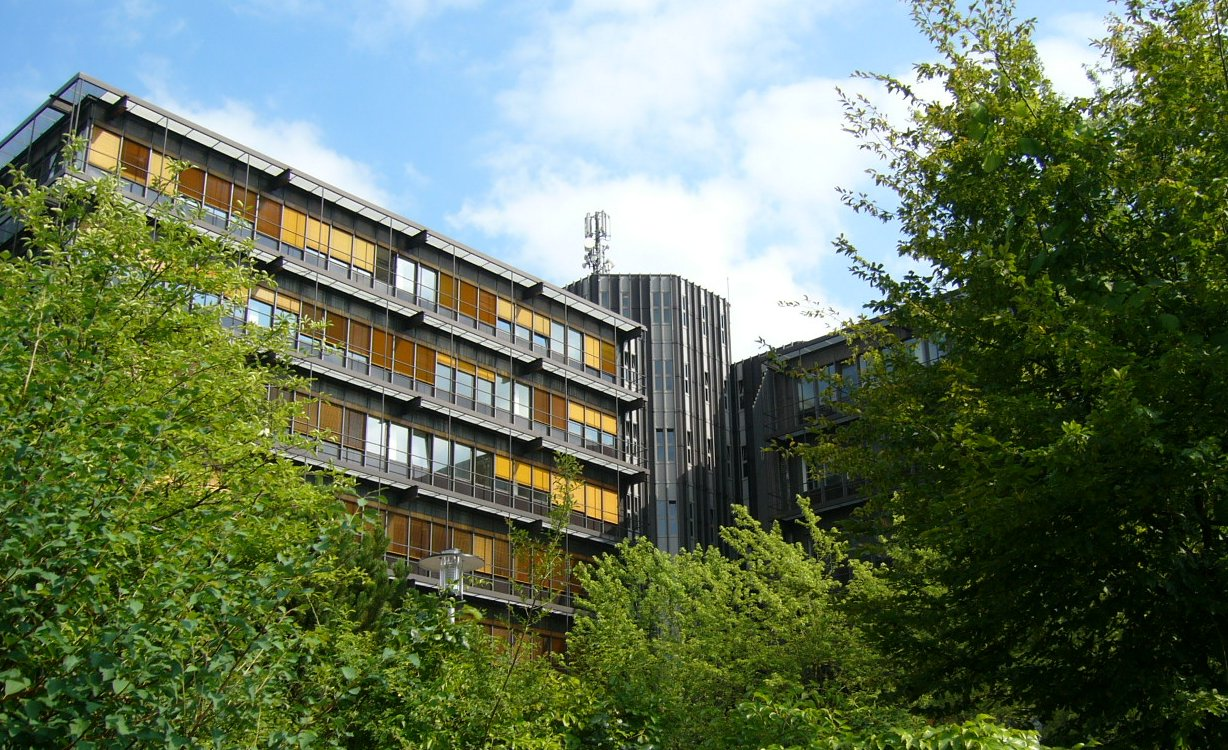
University on the "Westerberg", "AVZ Building", housing (among others) the Institute of Computer Science and the library of mathematics and science

Osnabrück University (German: Universität Osnabrück) is a public research university located in the city of Osnabrück in Lower Saxony, Germany.

Established in 1974, the university is known for its many interdisciplinary degree programmes, with some of them rare or even unique among German universities; including European studies, migration studies, applied systems science and cognitive science. It is also notable for its research in the above fields, as well as in others including peace and conflict studies, artificial intelligence, computational linguistics.

== History ==
Higher education began in 1632 in Osnabrück when the Gymnasium Carolinum was upgraded into a Catholic Jesuit university (which was not a university in the modern sense). However, the Academia Carolina Osnabrugensis was closed just one year later when Swedish troops recaptured Osnabrück for the Protestant side in the Thirty Years' War.

The government of the state of Lower Saxony decided to set up a university in Osnabrück in 1970, and by 1973 had laid down the legal basis for such an institution. The university opened for the summer semester in 1974 as a successor institution to the Adolf Reichwein Teachers' College, which had occupied the former palace of the Prince-Bishopric since 1953.

== Location ==
The main building of Osnabrück University is the baroque castle (built 1667–1675), formerly home and office to the Prince-Bishop of Osnabrück, nowadays housing mainly university administration. It is located close to the city center. In summer, the (mostly grass-covered) castle court is used for open air cinema and concerts.

Most faculty buildings are scattered in close vicinity of the castle. The sport stadium and gymnasium are a bit farther away. The mathematical and natural-scientific faculties as well as the botanical garden are located in the western part of the city in the borough of Westerberg. The campus at Westerberg is in parts shared with the neighbouring University of Applied Sciences. The distance between castle and the Westerberg campus is about 2.3 km.

== Departments and Institutes ==
Osnabrück University consists of ten schools (Fachbereiche) and four interdisciplinary institutes. Schools are split up into subjects or institutes or both.

The Schools and interdisciplinary institutes are:

- School of Cultural Studies and Social Sciences
- School of Educational and Cultural Studies
- School of Physics
- School of Biology/Chemistry
- School of Mathematics/Computer Science
- School of Language and Literary Studies
- School of Human Sciences
- School of Business Administration and Economics
- School of Law
- Institute of Migration Research and Intercultural Studies
- Institute of Early Modern Intercultural Studies
- Institute of Cognitive Science
- Institute of Environmental Systems Research

== Partnership programmes ==
The university is part of the German Academic Exchange Service's Helmut-Schmidt-Programme (also known as Public Policy and Good Governance Scholarships for Developing Countries), alongside other institutions such as the Hertie School of Governance in Berlin and the Willy Brandt School of Public Policy in Erfurt. The program attracts people from Asia, Latin America, and Africa to study in selected German universities for a policy-oriented Master's program.

== Notable alumni ==
Former President of Germany, Christian Wulff, is an alumnus of the university.

== See also ==
- Education in Germany
- Fachhochschule
- List of early modern universities in Europe
- List of universities in Germany
