= Eversburg =

Coordinates: 52.2960°N 7.9913°E

Eversburg is a district located in the north-west of the city of Osnabrück, Lower Saxony, Germany.

== Location ==
On the north side, Eversburg borders on the district of Büren in the municipality of Lotte, in North Rhine-Westphalia. It also borders on the Osnabrück districts of Pye, Hafen, Westerberg and Atter (in a clockwise direction).

== Name origin ==
This formerly infertile area – through which a stream today known as the Landwehrbach flows – was once the site of the Hof Eversfeld (Eversfeld estate) which belonged to the nobleman Hermann von Blankena; in 1223 he sold it to the cathedral chapter of Osnabrück. Continuous disputes with the counts of Tecklenburg necessitated the establishment of a territorial army in Osnabrück and the fortification of the estate around 1300. The cathedral chapter converted the Hof Eversfeld into a moated castle, whose trenches were supplied from the river. From this point onwards the estate became known as Eversburg; this name was first mentioned in civic records in 1383.

== District ==
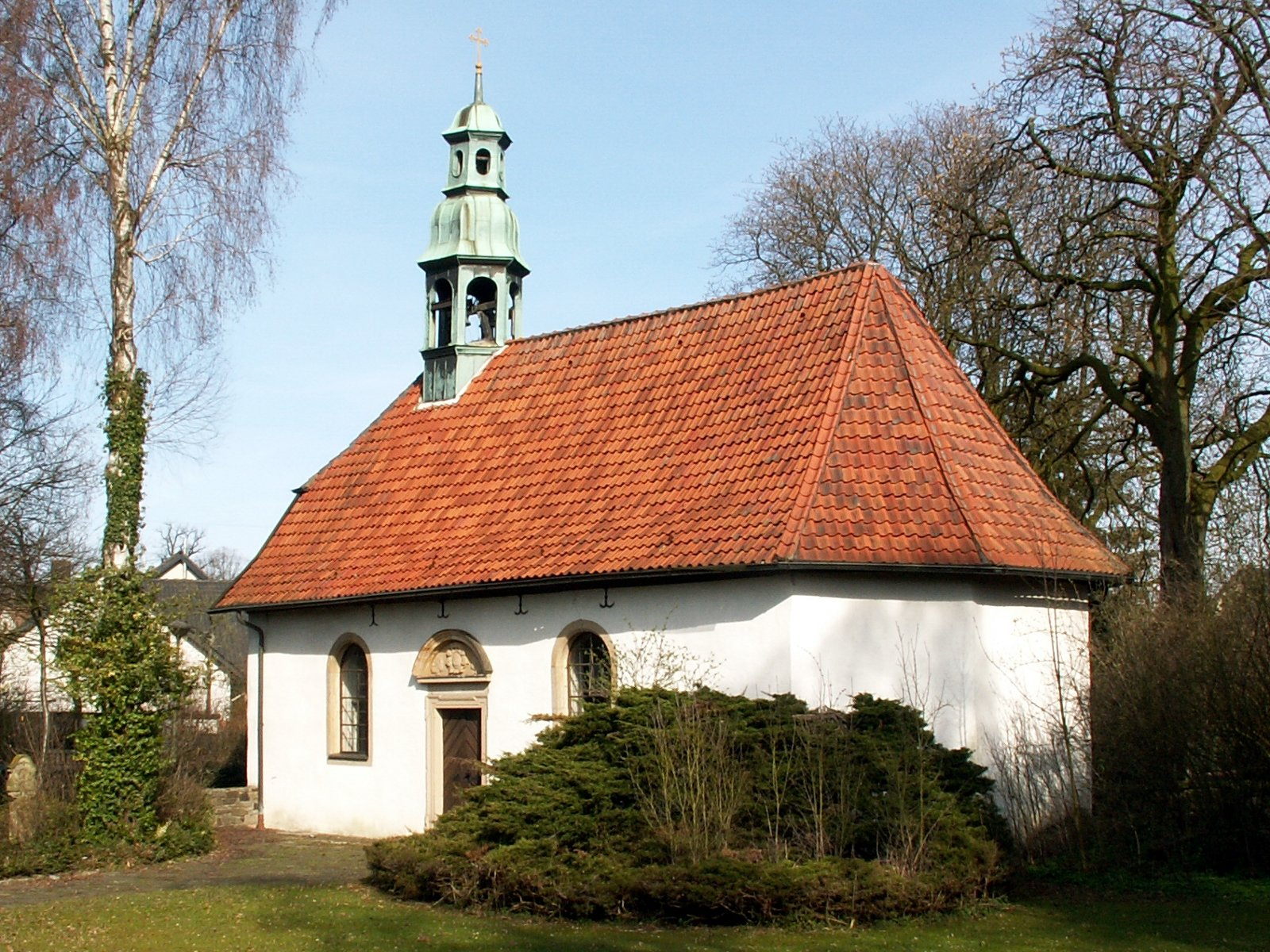
“Maria Trost” castle chapel

The Evangelical church St. Michaeliskirche (St. Michael's Church), the Catholic church Liebfrauenkirche Eversburg (Church of Our Lady), a Serbian Orthodox church, and a mosque are located in Eversburg. As a result of the city's troubled economic situation, the district library is under threat of closure.

There is a local recreation area in the south-west of the district (along with the Rubbenbruchsee).

== Transport links ==
Eversburg is positioned on several rail lines; earlier it had its own train station (Osnabrück-Eversburg). Lines which passed/pass through here include the Hannover-Amsterdam, Delmenhorst/Oldenburg-Osnabrück and Tecklenburger Nordbahn (Tecklenburg Northern Rail, from Rheine via Mettingen) routes. In the SPNV Westfalen-Lippe local transport plan, the restoration of a half-hourly regional rail service from Osnabrück to Recke is suggested on account of its potential profitability. This could possibly entail the reopening of the Osnabrück-Eversburg station. Furthermore, a new railway station (Osnabrück/Lotte) is envisioned on the city boundary. Eversburg was also attached to Osnabrück's first O-Buslinie (O bus line); line number 5 ran (with tram link) from Rißmüllerplatz through Natruper Straße, dividing into two sub-lines heading towards Eversburg-Büren and Eversburg-Atter. Today, city buses travel through Eversburg heading from the terminus stations with these same names.

== Links ==
- http://www.osnabahn.de/bahnhof-eversburg/
