= Hellern =

District of Osnabrück, Lower Saxony, Germany

Coordinates: 52.2572°N 7.9947°E

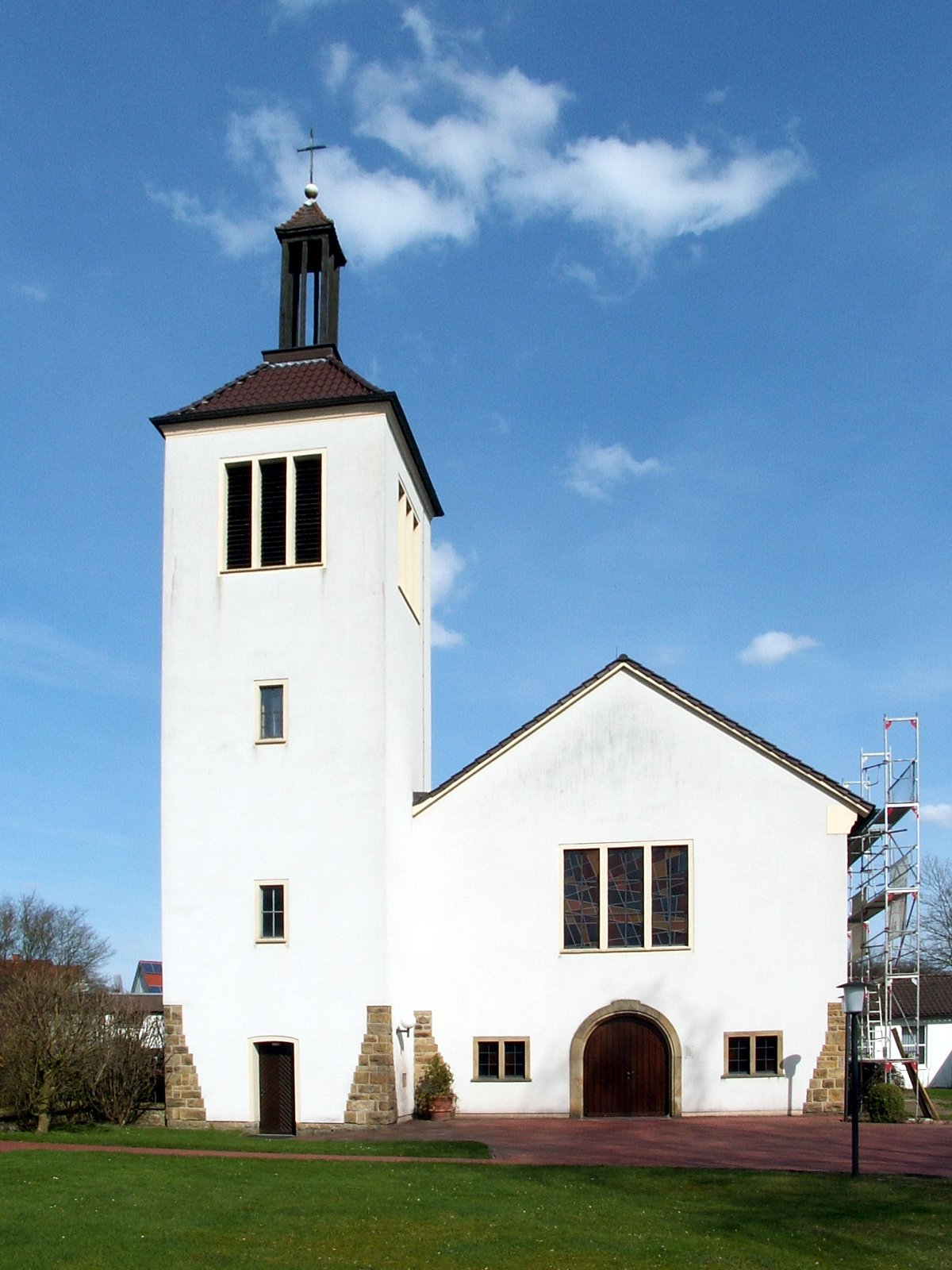
Martinskirche (St. Martin's Church)

Hellern is a district of Osnabrück with roughly 6,800 residents, located on the western and south-western borders of the city. It is bordered by the Atter, Westerberg, Weststadt, Wüste and Sutthausen districts; on its west and south-west it borders on the municipality of Lotte in North Rhine-Westphalia and also Hasbergen in the surrounding district of Osnabrück. Hellern is located in the valley of the small Düte river.

== History and landscape ==
Originally Hellern was a village in the district of Osnabrück; as part of a larger administrative reform in the area it was incorporated into Osnabrück on 1 July 1972, which based its decision to do so on the shortage of building land in the city.

A land-use plan for Hellern was put together in 1973. An industrial estate was set up between Bundesautobahn 30 and the Rheiner Landstraße. Four high-rise buildings were scheduled to be constructed on a five-hectare site along Töpferstraße, however after this idea was vehemently rejected the city wished only to build one eight-storey residential house. Today there are numerous three to four-storey residential houses along the Töpferstraße. After the city built a school, kindergarten and community centre planning started to turn towards turning the area into a central location in the city; however there were too few businesses in the area to achieve this.

There are two churches in Hellern: the Protestant Martinskirche and the Catholic St. Wiho-Kirche.

== Transportation ==
The Lengericher Landstraße runs through the middle of Hellern – eventually becoming Martinistraße, it carries on into the Innenstadt, and is one of the largest arterial roads in Osnabrück. Regular city and regional bus lines serve Hellern, connecting it to Osnabrück Hauptbahnhof (central station) and Hasbergen train station, among other destinations.

== Local clubs/groups ==
- Freiwillige Feuerwehr Osnabrück-Stadtmitte (Osnabrück City Centre Voluntary Fire Department), providing general assistance and fire protection.
- Sportverein Hellern von 1924 e.V. (Hellern Sport Club 1924)
- Männergesangsverein MGV Hermania Hellern (male choral society)
- Schützenbruderschaft Hellern (Hellern Shooting Club)

== Links ==
- Quarterly information from the Referat Stadtentwicklung und Bürgerbeteiligung (Department for Urban Development and Citizen Participation), Statistics Department, 4/2008 (PDF file, 1.49 MB, in German)
- City of Osnabrück, Referat für Stadtentwicklung und Bürgerbeteiligung – Statistics Department, 11/2009 (PDF file, 35.4 KB)
