= List of Bahamian artists =

This is a list of artists who were born in the Bahamas or whose artworks are closely associated with that country. Artists are listed by field of study and then by last name in alphabetical order, and they may be listed more than once, if they work in many fields of study.

== Designers ==
- Stanley Burnside (born 1947), Bahamian cartoonist, painter, and costume designer; he penned the Sideburns editorial cartoon for The Nassau Guardian
- Raymond Roker, American graphic designer, electronic music DJ, and club promoter; of Bahamian and Jewish descent.
- Gio Swaby (born 1991), textile artist and designer

== Painters ==
- Stanley Burnside (born 1947), painter and cartoonist
- Amos Ferguson (1920–2009), folk artist and painter
- Kendal Hanna (1936–2024), painter and sculptor, the Bahamas’ first abstract expressionist
- Brent Malone (1941–2004), painter and gallery owner
- Lavar Munroe (born 1982), painter, mixed media drawer, and installation artist
- Christophe Roberts (born 1980), multidisciplinary artist working in sculpture, graphic design, painting, and creative direction
- Horace Kenton Wright (1915–1976), watercolorist, painter

== Photographers ==
- Tamika Galanis, photographer, filmmaker, writer, researcher

== Sculptors ==
- Janine Antoni (born 1964), Bahamian–born American multidisciplinary artist and sculptor
- April Bey (born 1987), Bahamian–born American multidisciplinary artist, known for her mixed media tapestries focused on contemporary Black female rhetoric
- Blue Curry (born 1974), sculptural assemblage and installation art
- Anina Major (born 1981), Bahamian–born American multidisciplinary artist and sculptor
- Antonius Roberts (born 1958), sculptor and installation artist
- Christophe Roberts (born 1980), multidisciplinary artist working in sculpture, graphic design, painting, and creative direction
- Tavares Strachan (born 1979), Bahamian-born American conceptual artist, known for his sculptures and installation art

== See also ==
- List of Bahamians
- List of Bahamian women artists
