= Betsy Boze =

Bahamian academic administrator

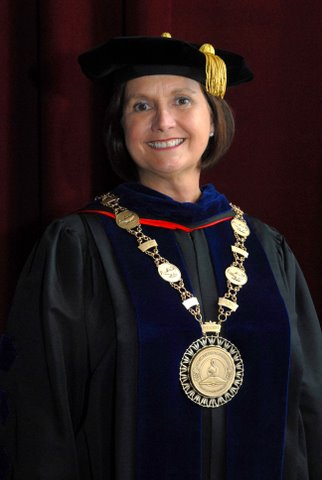
- Dr. Betsy V. Boze, the ninth President of the College of The Bahamas
- Born: Shreveport, Louisiana
- Education: PhD University of Arkansas MBA and B.S. (psychology) Southern Methodist University
- Occupations: Former president, College of The Bahamas
- Board member of: Girl Scouts of Alaska; The Glen Retirement System; Antiquities, Monuments and Museums Corporation (Bahamas); International Association of Universities; Bahamas National Trust; Gerace Research Center; The National Art Gallery of The Bahamas; Clifton Heritage National Park; Chairman, National Advisory Council on Education (Bahamas); Betty and Paul McDonald Foundation (USA); Bahamas Education, Culture and Science Foundation, Inc. (USA); Canadian Friends of COB (Canada)

Betsy Vogel Boze (pronounced Bōz) is an American academic and higher education administrator who served as the ninth President of The College of The Bahamas between 2010 and 2014. Previously, she worked as a professor of marketing, department chair, dean, and CEO of Kent State University at Stark, before serving as the president of The College of The Bahamas. She is a senior fellow at the American Association of State Colleges and Universities (AASCU), that researches alternative revenue streams for public colleges and universities.

== Education ==
=== Secondary education ===
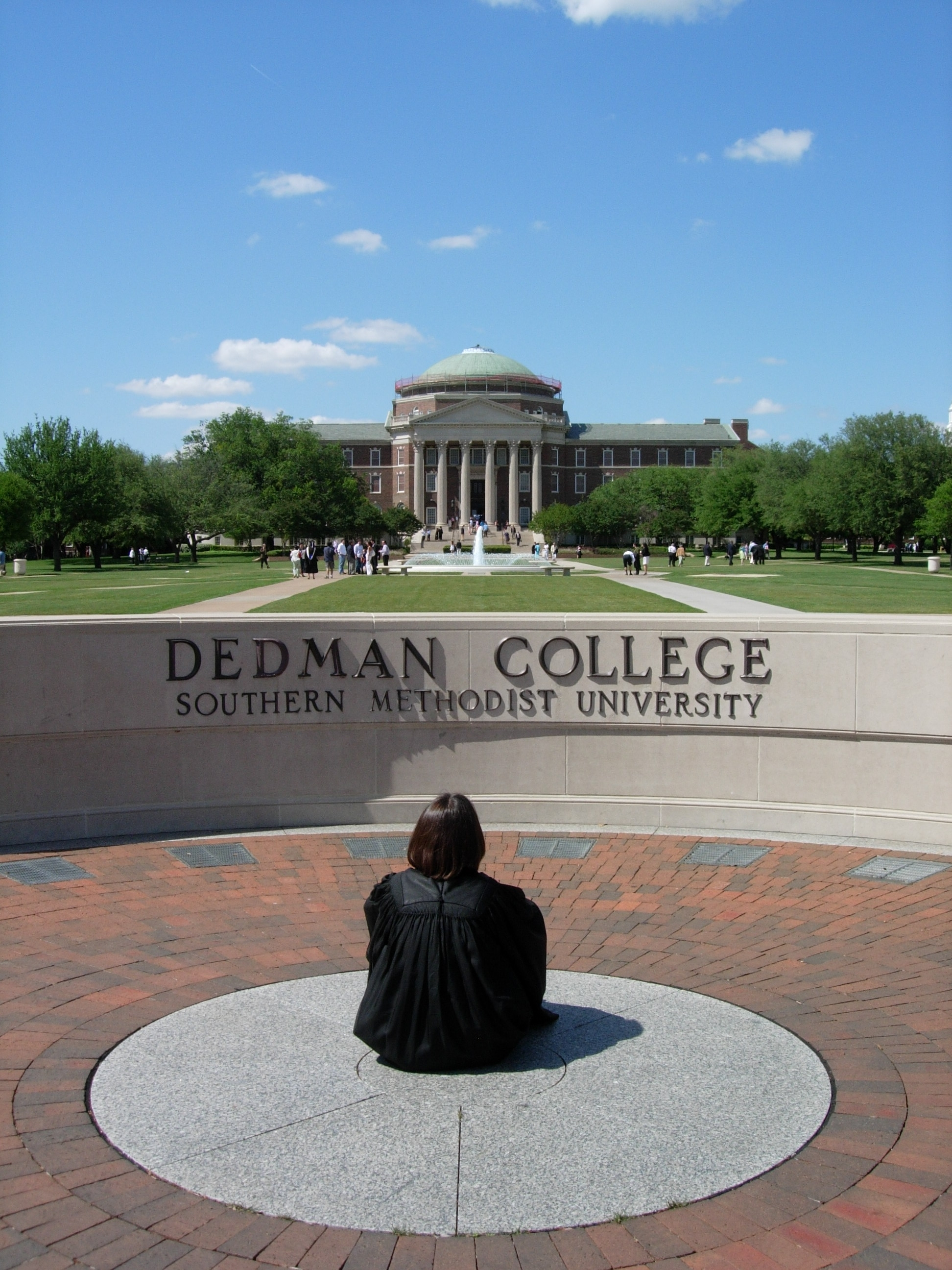
Contemplating SMU commencement

Boze attended Southfield School in Shreveport, Louisiana, and graduated from C. E. Byrd High School, where she participated in social and environmental issues, including the first Earth Day. In 2009, she was inducted into the Byrd High School Hall of Fame.

=== Formal education ===
Boze earned both her Bachelor of Science in Psychology and Masters in Business Administration degrees from Southern Methodist University (SMU) in Dallas, Texas. She studied international management at Thunderbird School of Global Management, Spanish at Monterrey Institute of Technology(ITESM) in Monterrey, Mexico, and Japanese at International Christian University (ICU) in Mitaka, Japan. She earned her PhD in business administration from the University of Arkansas, majoring in marketing with minors in economics and sociology.

=== Post-doctoral studies ===
Boze's postdoctoral studies include Harvard University Seminar for new presidents, Program on Negotiation at Harvard Law School, The University of Hawaiʻi Pan Asian Institute, Higher Education Resource Symposium (HERS), Bryn Mawr Summer Institute for Women in Higher Education Administration, American Association of State Colleges and Universities (AASCU) Millennial Leadership Initiative, The Center for Creative Leadership and a year-long American Council on Education (ACE) Fellowship. Boze is a graduate of Leadership Texas, Leadership America and Leadership Stark County.

== University experience ==
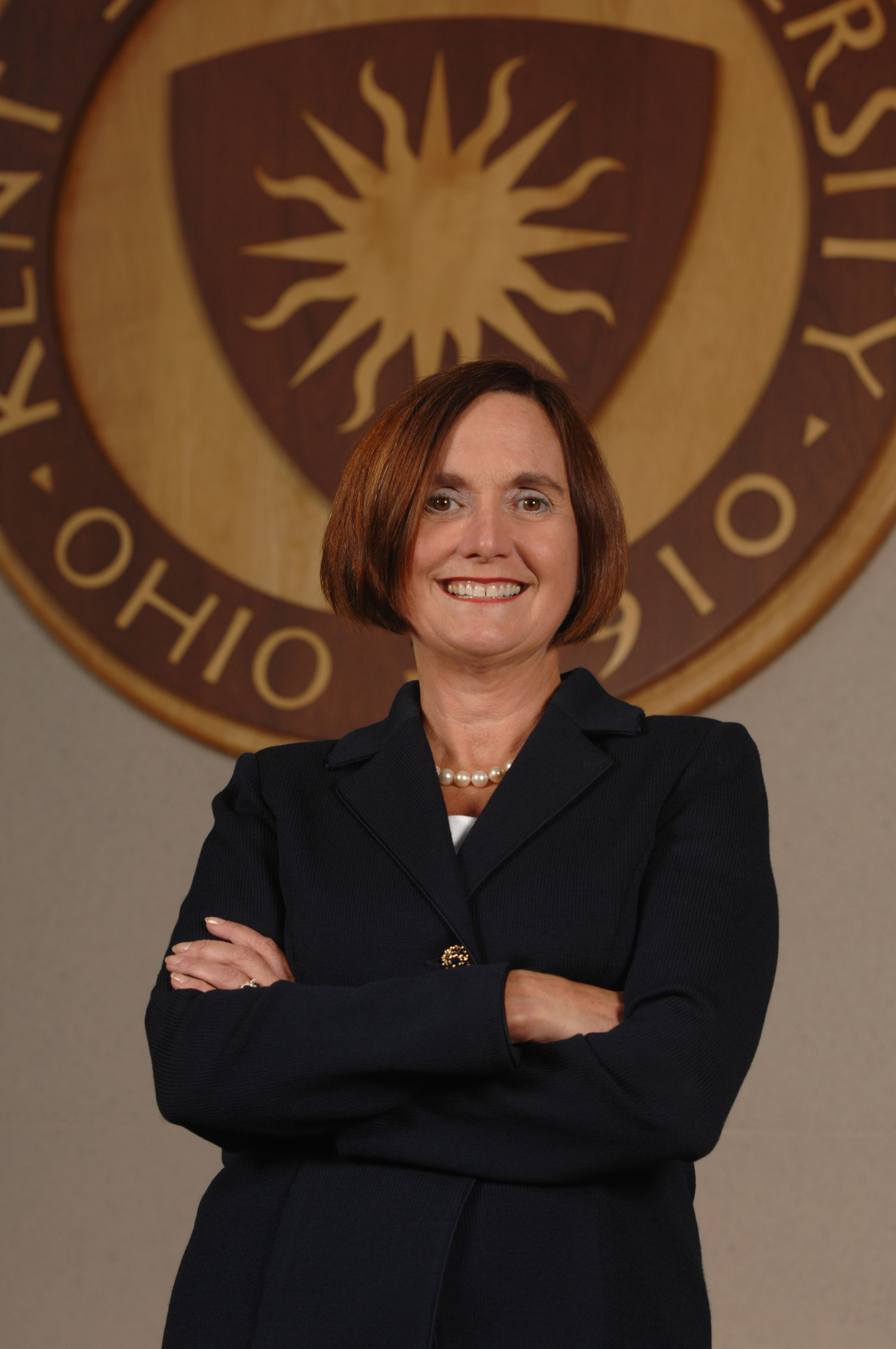
Dr. Betsy V. Boze

=== Faculty, Teaching, Administrative Appointments and Fundraising ===
Boze was the ninth president and chief executive officer of the College of the Bahamas. During her tenure at The College of the Bahamas, Boze:

- Opened a new Northern Bahamas Campus on Grand Bahama;
- Opened the new Harry C. Moore Library on the Oakes Field Campus;
- Remodeled buildings including the Residence Halls and the Student Union Building;
- Developed a Confucius Institute in partnership with NUIST the Nanjing University of Information Science and Technology;
- Created an Erasmus Mundus Action 2 consortium grant with Free University of Belgium, and an MOU with University of London to jointly deliver an LLM program in maritime law;
- Established the Oral History Institute;
- Created the Bahamas Agricultural and Marine Science Institute (BAMSI);
- Created and expanded academic success celebrations to increase student retention;
- Signed an Agreement with the Lyford Cay Foundation to sponsor a creative outreach program for at-risk 4th–12th grade students on COB campus which assists under-served, academically motivated students;
- Partnered with the Island School to co-brand the Cape Eleuthera Institute as the College of The Bahamas Cape Eleuthera Institute; and lastly,
- Boze assisted with opening the Franklin Wilson Graduate Business Building.

While Boze was the dean of Kent State University at Stark in North Canton, Ohio from 2005 to 2009, the campus became a four-year comprehensive liberal arts university with professional graduate degree programs. During Boze's tenure, the university developed and implemented the first strategic plan and first enrollment management plan.

=== Fund development ===
Through fundraising, Boze secured over $100 million in grants, federal earmarks and personal and corporate contributions for her institutions. Boze tripled the endowment at both Kent State University and at the College of the Bahamas by securing two dozen endowed scholarships to support student access and success. In addition to construction projects at the College of The Bahamas, public, private and foundation funds were developed for a new 45,000-square-foot (4,200 m^{2}) science building at Kent State University Stark designed to LEED Green Gold standards.

=== Senior Administrative Positions ===
Boze was the inaugural dean of the College of Business at The University of Texas at Brownsville and served as assistant to the president while an American Council on Education Fellow at Tulane University. She served as the chief academic officer of The University of Texas System "UT TeleCampus" MBA Online and held a Research Faculty appointment at Texas A&M University, where she was co-director of the Texas Ports & Waterways.

Boze has also held full-time faculty and administrative positions at St. Bonaventure University, University of Maryland University College in Japan, Germany, and Italy, Centenary College of Louisiana, and The University of Alaska Anchorage, where she was department chair of business administration and Faculty Senate president. In addition, Boze was a visiting faculty member at Portland State University in Khabarovsk [Хаба́ровск] in the former Soviet Union.

=== Publications and scholarly record ===
Boze has published over 100 peer-refereed research articles and book chapters on marketing and business administration. She writes and speaks publicly on higher education administration, distance education, technology and women's issues. Boze was also a planner in the creation of the University of Texas TeleCampus, the University of Texas's web-based, virtual university.

==== Academic partnerships and other collaborations ====
Boze has over twenty years' experience in unique academic partnerships.

- Boze served as the inaugural dean of business at both The University of Texas at Brownsville (a comprehensive state university) and Texas Southmost College (a community college). The two institutions were jointly accredited by the Southern Association of Colleges and Schools but separated in 2013.
- At the University of Alaska Anchorage, the community colleges were merged into the university system, serving as branch and two-year campuses.
- Under a 20-year lease, Kent State University Stark, a comprehensive regional university, leases 34 acres (14 ha) to neighboring Stark State College of Technology. As co-located institutions, Kent State Stark provides library services and articulates many programs and courses.
- Boze made the College of the Bahamas is home to several University of the West Indies academic programs, including the LLB program.

== Professional and Community Leadership and Service ==
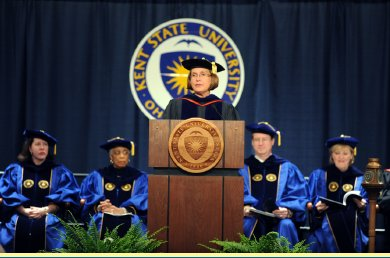
Dr. Betsy Boze presiding over Kent State University Stark Commencement

Boze served as the chief executive officer of the Gerace Research Center and serves on the board of the International Association of Universities. She serves on the A۰P۰L۰U- AASCU Advisory Group on Distance Education, the AASCU Policies and Practices Committee, an AASCU state representative, and the board of the Millennial Leadership Initiative.

Boze is a director of the Betty and Paul McDonald Foundation (Louisiana, US) and the Florida-based Bahamas Education, Culture, and Science Foundation, Inc. She is a former director or trustee on the following national boards in The Commonwealth of The Bahamas: the College of the Bahamas Council, Antiquities, Monuments, and Museums Corporation, the Gerace Research Center, the National Art Gallery of The Bahamas, the Clifton Heritage National Park, the Bahamas National Trust and the National Advisory Council on Education. She is a director of the Canadian Foundation, Canadian Friends of COB.

Boze was a commissioner on the City of Canton Sustainability Commission and vice chair of the Canton Regional Chamber of Commerce. She served as trustee on the boards of the Stark County Port Authority, American Cancer Society (Ohio), Canton Museum of Art, Greater Canton Chamber of Commerce, Mayor's Literacy Commission (Canton, OH), Ohio Area Health Education Centers, Ohio Citizens for the Arts, Paul and Betty McDonald Foundation, Stark Development Board, and the Stark Education Partnership P-16.

She served on Rep. William Healy's mayoral transition team and inaugural committee and the Ohio Board of Regents task force to revise the operating manual for two-year campus programs. She was the president of the Ohio Association of Regional Campuses. She further served on the Jackson-Belden Chamber of Commerce Economic Development Committee, the strategic planning committee of the Stark Development Board, the strategic planning committee of the Stark County YMCA, Lake Local Schools, and the Greater Canton Regional Chamber of Commerce Education Committee. She is a member of the Junior League of Washington, D.C.

== Professional and Public Service to Higher Education ==
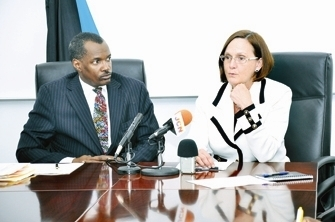
Boze with then-Minister of Education of the Bahamas Desmond Bannister (in 2011)

National appointments include the finance committee of the American Council on Education Council of Fellows, the American Association of State Colleges and Universities (AASCU) Women Presidents and Chancellors affinity group, and the AASCU Policies and Practices Committee. She is a sponsor, mentor, and faculty member of the AASCU Millennial Leadership Initiative.

Boze is a Higher Learning Commission (North Central Association of Colleges and Universities) AQIP consultant/evaluator and PEAQ peer reviewer.

She served as faculty for the 2007–2009 ACE National and Regional Leadership Forums and the 2006–2009 American Association of State Colleges and Universities Millennial Leadership Institutes. In addition, she annually serves as an AASCU MLI mentor at the HERS Bryn Mawr Summer Institute for Women in Higher Education Administration. Boze serves on the ACE Office of Women in Higher Education executive board.

She was a team leader for the 2007 AASCU Hispanic Student Success Report and a 2008 delegate to the Mid-West Higher Education Consortium. Boze serves on the editorial boards of the international journal Teaching & Learning in Higher and Continuing Education and the American Council on Education Network News.

More recently, Boze served as the president of the Southwest Business Deans, the Texas Council of Collegiate Education in Business (Texas College and University Business Deans), Junior Achievement (Rio Grande Valley, Texas), and the Girl Scouts Susitna Council (Alaska).

From 1996 to 2005, Boze served as the state coordinator of the American Council on Education Women's Network for Texas and serves on the editorial board of ACE Network News. From 1997 to 2005, she chaired the Women Administrators in Management Education (the women's affinity group) of the Association for the Advancement of Colleges and Schools of Business.

== Environmental Leadership and Service ==
Boze has a lifelong passion for the environment. She secured private funding for the Hoover Center for Environmental Media Activism. Under her leadership, Kent State Stark was recognized on the President's Higher Education Community Service Honor Roll every year from 2006 to 2009. Boze's leadership in P-16 collaboration led to alignment of high school graduation requirements in mathematics with workforce readiness and college readiness.

Boze signed the American College and University President's Climate Commitment (ACUPCC) for both Kent State University and the College of The Bahamas

Ecology Flag

Boze sewed and flew one of the first Ecology Flags for the original Earth Day. She is considered an international leader in Education for Sustainable Development. She was instrumental in the IAU Iquitos Statement on Higher Education for Sustainable Development, part of the United Nations Decade of Education for Sustainable Development.

As both president of the College of The Bahamas and CEO and Dean of Kent State University at Stark, Boze signed the American College and University Presidents Climate Commitment, and the campus joined the Association for the Advancement of Sustainability in Higher Education, and became one of the largest recyclers in Stark County (Ohio). The campus is the site of Stark County's Earth Day and dedicated a pond as a federally protected wetland in 2007. Beginning with the 2008 graduating class, graduates were encouraged to take the "Graduation Pledge" of social and environmental responsibility.

== Delta Delta Delta Leadership ==
Boze is a third-generation Delta Delta Delta (Theta Kappa, Southern Methodist University). She served as the president of the Delta Delta Delta Alumnae Chapter (Alaska), president of the Rio Grande Valley Alumnae Chapter (Texas), state reference chairman (Alaska), alumnae advisor of the University of Arkansas collegiate chapter, panhellenic advisor at the Louisiana State University Shreveport collegiate chapter, and president of Wish Upon a Star, at the Shreveport, Louisiana alumnae chapter philanthropy events.
