= National Art Gallery of the Bahamas =

National Art Gallery of The Bahamas

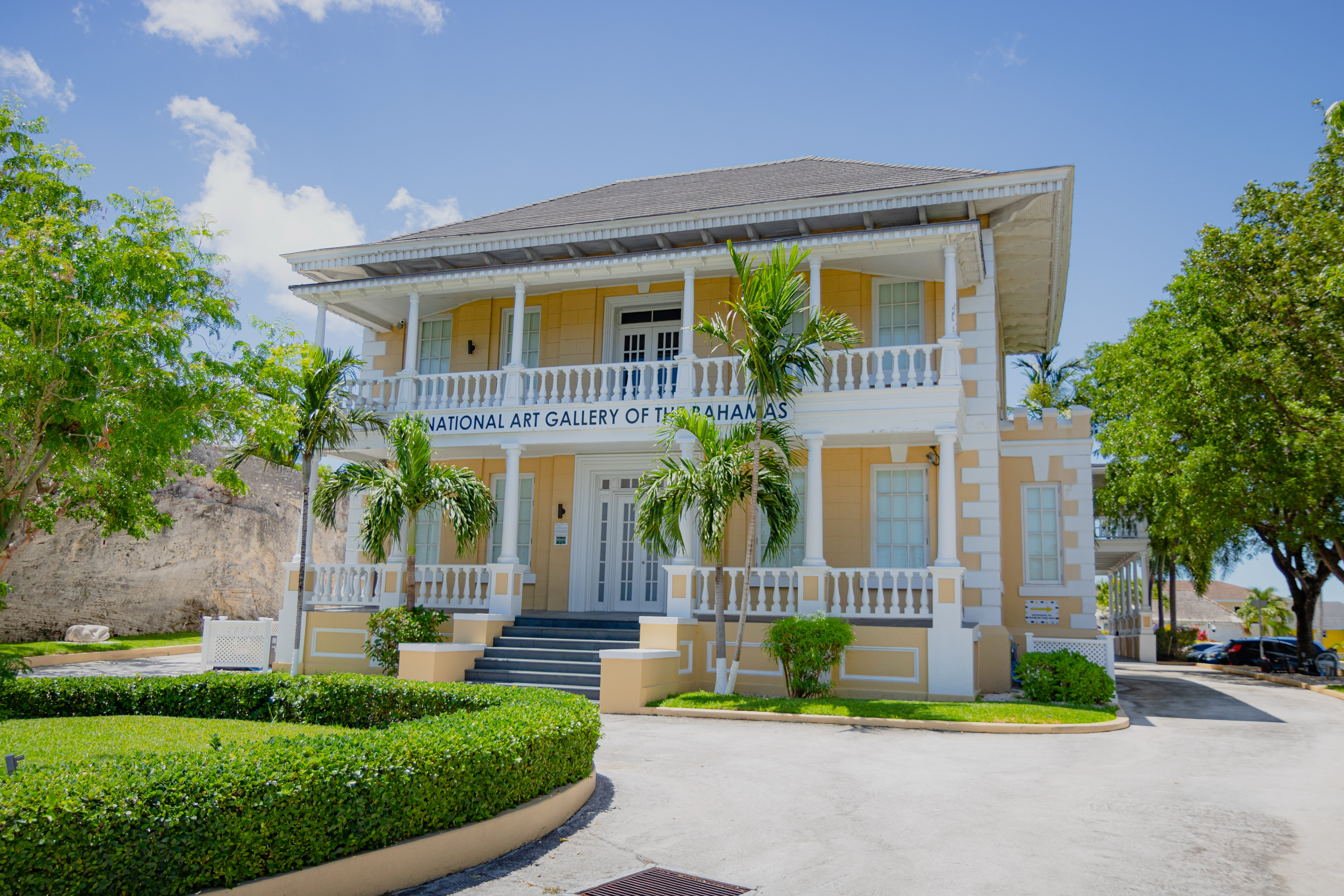
- National Art Gallery of The Bahamas
- Established: 1996
- Location: West Street, Nassau, The Bahamas
- Coordinates: 25.0754°N 77.3473°W
- Type: Art museum
- Executive director: Maelynn Ford
- Chairperson: John Cox
- Website: nagb.org.bs

The National Art Gallery of The Bahamas (NAGB) is an art museum located in Nassau, The Bahamas. It was the first institution of its kind in the country's history. Announced in 1996 by then-Prime Minister Hubert A. Ingraham, NAGB was part of a broader effort to record, preserve, and interpret the narrative of the independent, sovereign nation established in 1973.

NAGB is a non-profit, quasi-governmental institution that collects, preserves, exhibits, and interprets Bahamian art. The museum is partially funded by a government subvention but is independently overseen by a board of directors. It also relies on public and private support, including admission fees, memberships, donations, and other contributions. Its programming includes exhibitions, community outreach, access programmes, and educational workshops.

== History ==
The National Art Gallery of The Bahamas is housed in the historic Villa Doyle, situated at the corner of West and West Hill Streets in Downtown Nassau. Originally built in the 1860s as the residence of Sir William Henry Doyle, one of the first Chief Justices of The Bahamas, Villa Doyle underwent an expansion in the 1920s. The building was left to deteriorate, with some arguing for its demolition to erase a symbol of the colonial past. However, historian and founding NAGB chair Dr Gail Saunders spearheaded efforts to preserve it as a site for Bahamian cultural memory and interpretation.

The restoration of Villa Doyle took almost seven years and involved a team led by architect Anthony Jervis, civil engineer George Cox, and historian and committee chair Dr Gail Saunders, with consultation from art historian Dr Petrine Archer-Straw. Restoration work took place throughout the 1990s, with the structure converted into gallery spaces and officially opening as the National Art Gallery of The Bahamas in 2003.

=== Site and architecture ===
The museum is located at the junction of Downtown Nassau to the north and Over-the-Hill to the south, a residential neighbourhood. The museum occupies Villa Doyle, a colonial-era mansion built in 1862, blending neoclassical elements like decorative columns with Bahamian style wraparound verandahs and louvered shutters.

The building houses four gallery spaces: the Permanent Exhibition Gallery and the Project Space on the ground floor, and two temporary exhibition spaces (T1 and T2) on the second floor. The campus also includes a museum store, an Art Park, and Fiona's Theatre—an open-air amphitheatre for performances.

== Art ==
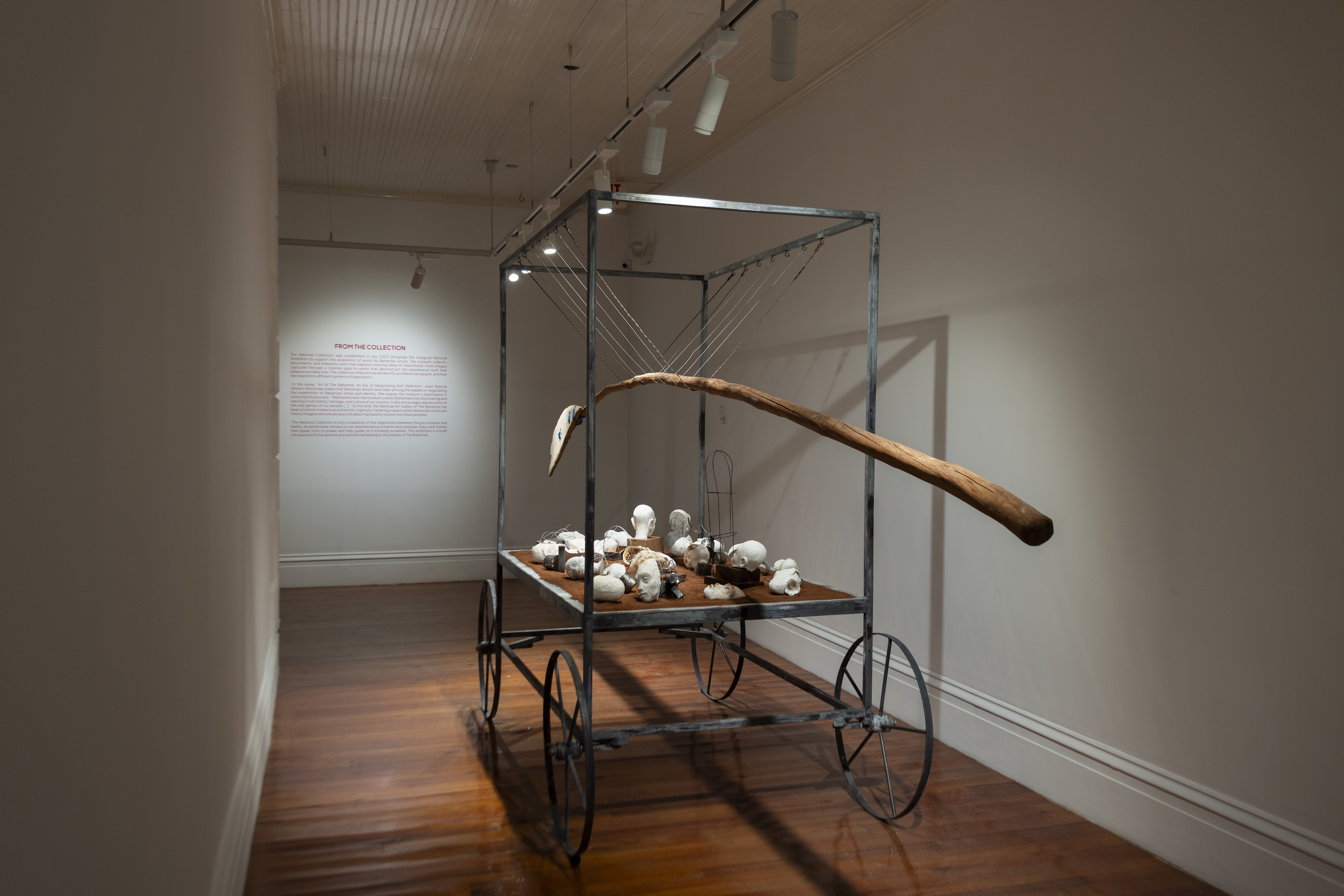
John Beadle, Row Yah Boat, 2016. National Collection, National Art Gallery of The Bahamas.

The museum has four gallery spaces: the Permanent Exhibition Gallery and the Project Space on the ground floor, and two temporary exhibition spaces (T1 and T2) on the second floor. NAGB's permanent collection features over 500 works of historic and contemporary Bahamian art, dating from the 1800s to today. The collection includes photography, painting, sculpture, digital media, and other forms. Artists in the collection include Blue Curry, Amos Ferguson, John Beadle, Lillian Blades, Stanley Burnside, Kendra Frorup, Kendal Hanna, Anina Major, R. Brent Malone, Lavar Munroe, Maxwell Taylor, and Antonius Roberts.

The campus features public artworks and sculptures throughout its grounds.

== Exhibitions and programming ==
The museum’s programmes include the Inter-Island Travelling Exhibition (ITE), which brings selections from the collection to Family Islands across The Bahamas. The museum’s biennial National Exhibition began in 2003, with 13 works acquired from the inaugural exhibition. During Holly Bynoe’s tenure as chief curator, the Double Dutch exhibition series was created to expand regional reach and foster cross-cultural collaboration.

The museum hosts educational workshops, family programmes, and public programmes including talks and lectures, and access initiatives such as Free Sundays.

== Leadership ==
NAGB has had several directors since its founding, each contributing to its development. Founding director Dr Erica James oversaw the museum’s establishment, building its permanent collection and curating early exhibitions during the institution’s formative years.

In 2011, Bahamian art critic, curator, and co-founder of VOLTA Art Fair, Amanda Coulson, was appointed executive director. She served as the museum’s longest-tenured leader, establishing institutional best practices while expanding the musem’s professional profile and its community outreach and engagement.

John Cox served as chief curator from 2012 to 2015 and was succeeded by St Vincentian curator Holly Bynoe, who held the position until December 2019.

Coulson stepped down as director in 2021 after nearly a decade of leadership. Following her tenure, Ian Bethell-Bennett, a University of The Bahamas professor, served as interim executive director. In January 2025, Maelynn Ford—a writer and higher education administrator, formerly chief of staff and university secretary at the University of The Bahamas—was appointed as the museum’s new executive director.

== See also ==
- List of national galleries
- National Gallery of Jamaica
