= Millennium Leadership Initiative =

Higher education leadership development program

The Millennium Leadership Initiative or MLI is a premier higher education leadership development program. Originally created by the African-American presidents of the American Association of State Colleges and Universities (AASCU) to help prepare traditionally underrepresented groups for university and college presidencies and chancellorships. The program is one of the most successful higher education programs and has expanded and is now open to all under-represented populations and participants need not be from AASCU member institutions. MLI has partnered with Association of Public and Land Grant Universities (APLU) and the Coalition of Urban and Metropolitan Universities to expand its reach to faculty and administrators that are interested in moving to upper administrative positions.

== Administration ==
The administration of the program is by an Executive Steering Committee of sitting presidents. The faculty in the Summer Institute volunteer their time to support the advancement of underrepresented groups.

== Mentoring Component ==
The highly selective program differs from other leadership programs largely because of its intensive mentoring program. Proteges meet for one week in the summer and are then paired with a sitting president or chancellor for the following year. The mentor and protege meet weekly by phone, communicate by email, and the protege shadows the mentor on his or her campus.

The initiative has been highly successful with sixty proteges appointed as president or chancellor in the programs fifteen years. Dozens of other proteges have moved up to vice president and Provost positions.

== Career advancements to presidents and chancellors ==
- Livingston Alexander, President, University of Pittsburgh at Bradford, PA (Class of ’01)
- Rodolfo Arrival, President, Eastern Washington University, (Class of ’00)
- Tony Atwater, Former President, Norfolk State University, Va. (Class of ’03)
- Stanley F. Battle, Former Interim President, Southern Connecticut State University (Class of ’02)
- Juliette Bell, President, University of Maryland Eastern Shore, (Class of ’07)
- Kweku K. Bentil, Retired Campus President, Miami Dade College (Class of ’02)
- Linda L. M. Bennett, President, The University of Southern Indiana (Class of ’05)
- Betsy V. Boze, President, College of the Bahamas (Class of ‘02)
- M. Christopher Brown II, President, Alcorn State University, MS (Class of ’02)
- "T. J. Bryan", Chancellor Emerita, Fayetteville State University, NC (Class of ’00)
- Nancy Cooley, Open Campus President, Florida State College at Jacksonville (Class of ’05)
- Don Cozzetto, Former President, University of Northern British Columbia (Class of ’00)
- Charles Curry, Former Acting President, Slippery Rock University of Pennsylvania (Class of ’02)
- Elizabeth Davis-Russell, President, Tubman College in Maryland County, Liberia (Class of ’04)
- Cheerly Dozier, President, Savannah State University, Georgia (Class of ’10)
- Beverly Edmond, Former Interim President, Alabama A&M University (Class of ’07)
- Royce Engstrom, President, The University of Montana (Class of ’09)
- Angela Franklin, President, Des Moines University (Class of ’04)
- William J. Fritz, Interim President, City University of New York, College of Staten Island (Class of ’10)
- Mildred García, President, California State University Fullerton (Class of ’99)
- Joanne Glasser, President, Bradley University, IL (Class of '00)
- Emmanuel Gonsalves, President, The College of Science, Technology and Applied Arts of Trinidad & Tobago (COSTAATT), (Class of’07)
- Ervin Griffin, President, Halifax Community and Technical College, NC (Class of ’99)
- Ivelaw L. Griffith, President, Fort Valley State University, GA (Class of ’05)
- Sandra Harper, President, McMurry University, TX (Class of ’02)
- Billy Hawkins, President, Talladega College (Class of ’00)
- Virginia S. Horvath, President, State University of New York at Fredonia, (Class of ’11)
- "Christopher B. Howard", President, Hampden-Sydney College, VA (Class of ’08)
- Michelle Howard-Vital, President, Cheyney University of Pennsylvania (Class of ’06)
- Cynthia Jackson-Hammond, President, Central State University, (Class of ’01)
- Melvin Johnson, Former President, Tennessee State University (Class of ’01)
- Glendell Jones, President, Henderson State University, AR (Class of ’08)
- Peter G. Jordan, President, Tarrant County College, South Campus, Fort Worth, TX (Class of ’11)
- Renu Khator, Chancellor of the University of Houston System and President of the University of Houston (Class of ’04)
- Walter W. Kimbrough, President, Dillard University (Class of 02)
- Raynard Kington, President, Grinnell College, IA (Class of ’07)
- Nancy Kleniewski, President, State University of New York at Oneonta (Class of ’06)
- Susan J. Koch, University of Illinois Springfield, Chancellor and Vice President (Class of ’03)
- Dorothy Leland, Chancellor, University of California, Merced (Class of ’02)
- Devorah Lieberman, President, University of La Verne at California, (Class of ’01)
- Henry Lewis, President, Florida Memorial University (Class of ’02)
- James Limbaugh, President, Montana State University Northern (Class of ’10)
- Wallace Loh, President, University of Maryland, (Class of ’10)
- Kofi Lomotey, Former Chancellor, Southern University and A&M College at Baton Rouge, LA (Class of '01)
- Andrea Miller, Chancellor, SOWELA Technical Community College, LA (Class of ’06)
- Keith T. Miller, President, Virginia State University (Class of ’00)
- Dana Mohler-Faria, President, Bridgewater State College, MA (Class of ‘99)
- Carlos Morales, President, Tarrant County College Connect (TCC Connect) (Class of ‘12)
- Tomás Morales, President, California State University San Bernardino, (Class of ’04)
- J. Keith Motley, Chancellor, University of Massachusetts-Boston (Class of ’00)
- Eduardo M. Ochoa, President at California State University, Monterey Bay (Class of ’02)
- Michael Ortiz, President Emeritus, California State Polytechnic University, Pomona (Class of ’99)
- Emmanuel Osagie, Former Chancellor, Pennsylvania State Fayette (The Eberly Campus), PA (Class of ’01) deceased
- John Ellis Price, Former President, University of North Texas at Dallas, (Class of ’09)
- Patricia Pierce Ramsey, Former Interim President, Bowie State University, MD (Class of ’05)
- Una Mae Reck, Former Chancellor, Indiana University South Bend (Class of '01)
- Ronald R. Rosati, Former Officer in charge, SUNY College of Technology at Alfred (Class of ’02)
- Debra Saunders-White, Chancellor, North Carolina Central University (Class of ’08)
- Dennis Shields, Chancellor, University of Wisconsin-Platteville (Class of ‘09)
- Rodney Smith, Former President, The College of the Bahamas, Nassau and Ramapo College of New Jersey (Class of ’00)
- Marlene Strathe, Former Interim President, Oklahoma State University (Class of ’99)
- Cornell Thomas, President, Jarvis Christian College, TX (Class of ’06)
- Victor Ukpolo, Chancellor, Southern University at New Orleans, LA (Class of ’00)
- Nancy Uscher, President, Cornish College of the Arts, WA (Class of ’08)
- DeLois P. Weekes, Former President, Clarkson College, NE (Class of '99)
- Gregory H. Williams, Former President, The University of Cincinnati (Class of ’00)
- Fred Wood, Chancellor, University of Minnesota Crookston (Class of ’11)
- Karl Wright, Former President, Florida Memorial University (Class of ’05)
- Mary Wyatt, Former President, Roanoke-Chowan Community College, Ahoskie, NC (Class of ’00)
