= Stanley Burnside =

Bahamian painter and cartoonist (born 1947)

- Born: 1947 (age 78–79); Nassau, The Bahamas
- Education: University of Pennsylvania
- Known for: Editorial cartooning, painting, costume design
- Notable work: Sideburns
- Movement: Afrofuturism, Junkanoo

Stanley "Stan" Burnside (born 1947) is a Bahamian cartoonist, painter, and costume designer. From 1979 to 2019, he penned the Sideburns editorial cartoon for The Nassau Guardian. As a painter, his style was influenced by the collaborative process of Junkanoo, an annual Caribbean street parade. He was a designer and artistic director for the Junkanoo groups Saxon Superstars and One Family. He has also been involved in several artist collaborations with fellow Bahamian artists and co-founded B-CAUSE, an artist collective dedicated to founding a national art gallery for The Bahamas and a national art school. He has been called a "pioneering voice in Afrofuturism".

Born in Nassau, Burnside attended school in the United States, receiving his BFA and MFA from the University of Pennsylvania. He taught art at the College of The Bahamas until 1990.

== Early life and education ==
Stanley Burnside was born in 1947 in Nassau, Bahamas. Sidney Poitier was his first cousin once removed. Burnside was educated at the Pennsylvania Academy of the Fine Arts and received his BFA from the University of Pennsylvania. In the late 1960s, he earned his MFA at the University of Pennsylvania. Afterwards, he stayed in the United States, designing album covers for R&B artists and painting.

== Art career ==
Burnside returned to Nassau in 1979 and was an art professor at the College of The Bahamas until 1990.

He was the principal artistic director and designer for the Junkanoo annual street parade groups One Family and Saxon Superstars. He also later led the Marina Village Junkanoo Troupe. Burnside's artistic creations outside of Junkanoo employ the exuberance and colors of the cultural celebration. In 1985, Burnside and his brother Jackson collaborated on Faces, a sculptural painting. Burnside characterized the work as a continuation of the art they had created through Junkanoo, saying "It was our attempt to take the process, the Junkanoo collaborative process, into the painting studio."

In 1991, Burnside joined with five other artists to form B-CAUSE (Bahamian Creative Artists United for Serious Expression). The group, which included his brother Jackson, as well as the artists Brent Malone, Maxwell Taylor, John Beadle, and Antonius Roberts, dedicated themselves to the foundation of the National Art Gallery of The Bahamas and the promotion of a national art school. Burnside, his brother, and Beadle worked together for a season in the Junkanoo shacks before producing the painting series Jammin I. They founded the artist collective Jammin and the trio Burnside-Beadle-Burnside. Roberts and Malone joined the collective in 1993, creating Jammin II. Burnside-Beadle-Burnside exhibited their works in Atlanta, Georgia, for the 1996 Summer Olympics. They also exhibited Jammin III in Brazil at the São Paulo Art Biennial. Burnside later joined with Beadle and Antonius Roberts to continue the Jammin series as Burnside, Beadle & Roberts.

Burnside was one of the artists featured in the 2008 documentary film Artists of the Bahamas by Karen Arthur and Tom Neuwirth. ArtReview called Burnside a "pioneering voice in Afrofuturism". A portrait of Burnside was created by artist Jamaal Rolle in 2014. Burnside was a consult on pageantry for the 2014 IAAF World Relays.

Burnside has exhibited in the United States, France, the Dominican Republic, Bermuda, Cuba, Ecuador, and Venezuela. His 2000 oil painting Solomon commemorates the Bahamian musician Exuma as King Solomon and is part of the collection of the National Art Gallery of The Bahamas. His works are also included in the collections of the Museo de Arte Moderno, Santo Domingo and the Art Museum of the Americas in Washington, DC. Burnside's 2022 solo exhibition at the Galerie Perrotin in New York, Stanley Burnside: As Time Goes On, was curated by his mentee, Bahamian conceptual artist Tavares Strachan.

=== Sideburns ===
Burnside was hired by The Nassau Guardian to be their editorial cartoonist in July 1979. His comic strip Sideburns ran six days a week in the Guardian for decades except for a brief period where it ran in The Tribune. In 1983, Burnside published a collection of his editorial cartoons entitled Off der top. The best of Sideburns. A cartoon history of contemporary Bahamas.

Sideburns cartoons were often single-panelled, featuring characters such as the Shack Rat and the Tourism Goose. The editorial cartoons usually addressed topics pertaining to The Bahamas, but also satirized international affairs. In the cartoons, he sketched out social commentary, with his subjects including sports, crime, religion, death, and business. Many of Burnside's comics were political cartoons. In a 1990 interview, he characterized his style as "poking fun at local political events and characters." According to Burnside, his themes cut through the "froth and zeroes in on the heart of issues". Burnside has said the size of the Bahamas can potentially be constraining, but "as long as I have both sides complaining about what I'm doing, I'm doing okay." Sideburns also employed development themes, with Burnside advocating on behalf of vaccination programs, programs to stop drunk driving, and the Heart Foundation.

After a 40-year run of Sideburns, including more than 10,000 cartoon panels, The Nassau Guardian terminated Burnside's employment in 2019. His final cartoon was published on 31 July 2019.

== Selected exhibitions ==
- 2010: The Optical and the Synthetic: A Collection of Recent Paintings by Stan Burnside, The Stan Burnside Gallery
- 2019: TimeLines: 1950–2007, National Art Gallery of the Bahamas, Nassau
- 2022: Stanley Burnside: As Time Goes On, Galerie Perrotin, New York
