= Keva Bethel =

Bahamian educator

- Born: Keva Marie Eldon; 18 August 1935; Saint Matthews Parish, Colony of the Bahamas
- Died: 15 February 2011 (aged 75); Nassau, The Bahamas
- Occupation: educator
- Years active: 1959–98
- Known for: 1st president of the College of the Bahamas

Keva Marie Bethel, CMG (18 August 1935 – 15 February 2011) was a Bahamian educator and the first president of the College of the Bahamas.

== Early life ==
Bethel was born Keva Marie Eldon on 18 August 1935 in Nassau, Bahamas to Rowena (née Hill) and Sidney Eldon.

She attended Queen's College in Nassau, graduating in 1950.

In 1954, she enrolled at Kirby Lodge School in Little Shelford, in preparation for the Cambridge examinations. After two years of study, she entered Girton College, Cambridge studying languages, with a specialisation in French and Spanish, graduating in 1959.

== Career ==
=== Government High School ===
Eldon returned to Nassau in 1959 and began teaching at Government High School.

She completed her master's degree in 1963 and, in 1966, she was appointed Deputy Headmistress of Government High School and began involvement in the planning phases for the establishment of the College of the Bahamas.

=== College of the Bahamas ===
In 1975, when the College was launched, she transferred there as the first Chair of the Humanities Department. Later she served as academic dean, and vice-principal.

=== President of the College ===
In 1981, Bethel completed her PhD at the University of Alberta and, the following year, was appointed as Principal of the College of the Bahamas, leading the organisation for the next sixteen years.

During her tenure, she worked to change the curricula from offering Associate degrees to an institution fully-accredited to confer Bachelor's degrees and pressed for the reorganisation of the college into a university.

When the College was reorganised in 1995, she became the inaugural president and that same year was made a companion of the Order of St Michael and St George. She served as president through 1998, when she retired.

=== Retirement ===
After her retirement, Bethel began writing a book chronicling the history of education in the Bahamas, which was unfinished when she died. During this time, she also served on the National Advisory Council in Education and Government Student Loan Programme.

The College of the Bahamas became the University of the Bahamas in 2016.

== Personal life ==
In 1962, she married E. Clement Bethel and the couple had two children, Nicolette and Edward.

Her only sibling was Bishop Michael Eldon, first Bishop of Nassau.

== Death and legacy ==
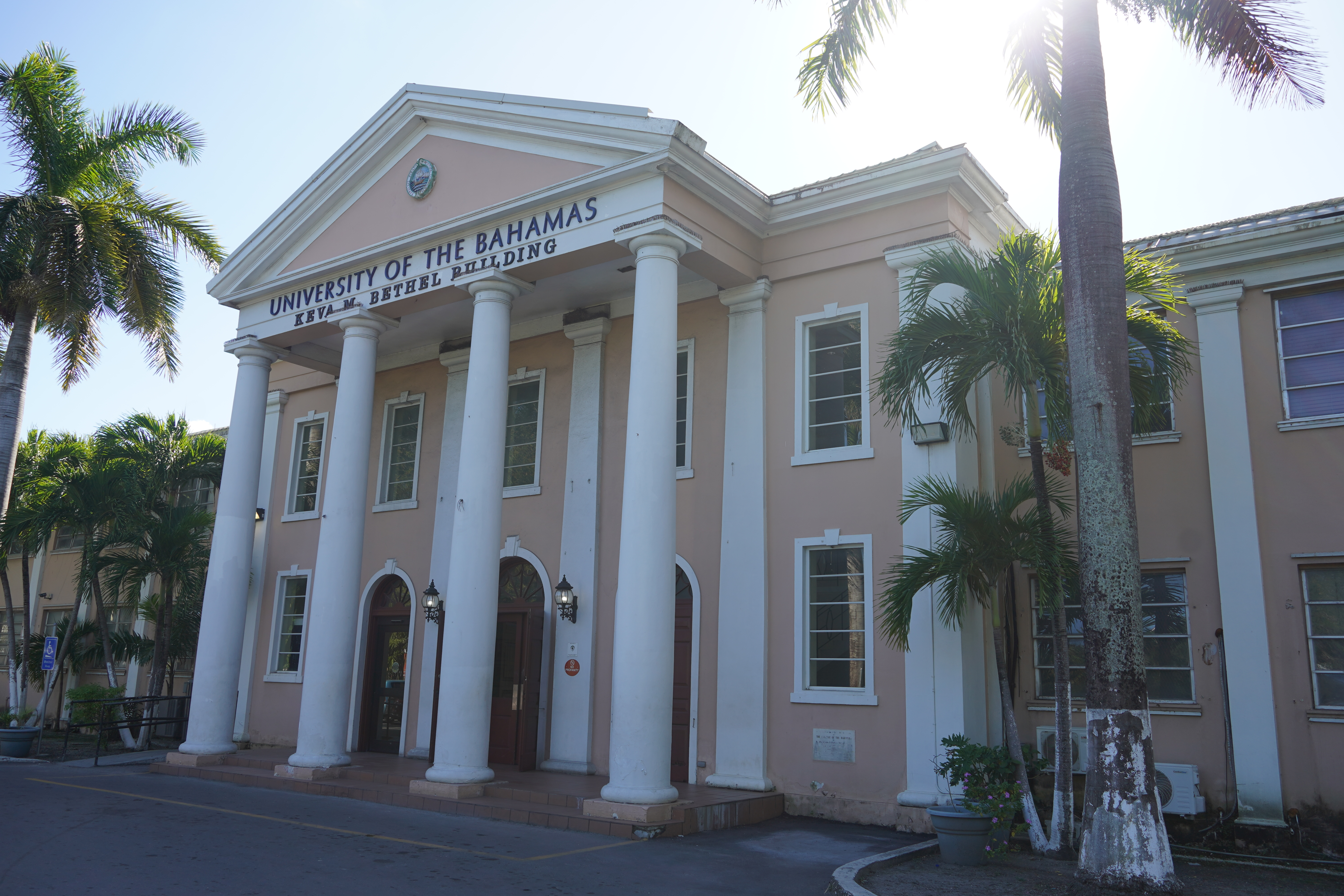
Keva M. Bethel Building at the University of The Bahamas

Bethel died from ovarian cancer on 15 February 2011 in Nassau, eight days after her brother. She is remembered for her contributions to the development of education in the Bahamas and particularly to the University of the Bahamas. In 2012, the University of The Bahamas renamed the university administration building as the "Keva M. Bethel Building" in honor of her advocacy for the Bahamian government to invest in national education.

== Bibliography ==
- Hanna-Ewers, Deanne (2013). Great Women in Bahamian History: Bahamian Women Pioneers. Bloomington, Indiana: AuthorHouse. ISBN 978-1-4520-5398-1.
- Reed, Frederick (17 February 2011). "Former COB President Dr. Keva Bethel Dies at 75". Nassau, The Bahamas: Bahamas B2B. Archived from the original on 18 October 2017.
- "A dedicated brother and sister leave the scene". The Tribune. Nassau, The Bahamas. 16 February 2011.
- "Bahamian Births 1934–1935: Keva Marie Eldon". FamilySearch. Nassau, The Bahamas: Registrar General. 18 August 1935. FHL digital folder #4934260.
- "Dr. Keva Marie Bethel, CMG, President Emerita and Scholar in Residence at the College of The Bahamas passed away at Doctor's Hospital". Nassau, The Bahamas: Bahamas Press. 15 February 2011. Archived from the original on 21 June 2015.
- "Keva Bethel (Eldon) 1935–2011". Girton College Annual Review. Girton, Cambridgeshire, England: Girton College, Cambridge: 129. Summer 2011.
