= List of Bahamian women artists =

This is a list of women artists who were born in the Bahamas or whose artworks are closely associated with that country.

== A ==
- Janine Antoni (born 1964), Bahamian–born American multidisciplinary artist

== B ==
- April Bey (born 1987), Bahamian–born American multidisciplinary artist, known for her mixed media tapestries

== G ==
- Tamika Galanis, artist, filmmaker, writer, researcher

== S ==
- Gio Swaby (born 1991), textile artist and designer

== See also ==
- List of Bahamian artists
- List of Bahamians
