= Tamika Galanis =

Bahamian artist

- Born: Bahamas
- Education: College of the Bahamas, Duke University
- Occupations: Multimedia artist and documentarian
- Website: www.tamikagalanis.com

Tamika Galanis is a Black Bahamian multimedia artist and documentarian examining topics of Bahamian identity and culture, tourism, and archival histories.

== Education and career ==
Galanis earned a BA degree in Liberal Arts from Clayton State University and a Master of Fine Arts in Experimental and Documentary Arts from Duke University in 2016. Galanis is the Jon B. Lovelace Fellow for the Study of the Alan Lomax Collection at the John W. Kluge Center at the Library of Congress.

Galanis is an Assistant Professor of Film in the department of film and media studies at Syracuse University, New York.

== Exhibitions ==
- 2024 Spirit in the Land, Pérez Art Museum Miami, Florida
- 2023 Spirit in the Land, Nasher Museum of Art at Duke University, Durham, North Carolina
- 2021 Atlantic World Art Fair
- 2017 Übersee: Kuba und die Bahamas. Gegenwartskunst aus der Karibik, Leipzig

== See also ==
- List of Bahamian women artists
