= Antonius Roberts =

Bahamian artist

Antonius Roberts (born 1958) is a Bahamian artist, teacher, and curator. He is known for his installations and sculptures. Roberts was one of the founders of the art group "B-CAUSE" in 1991.

== Biography ==
Born in January 1958, in Nassau, Roberts received his BFA degree in painting, in 1981, from the Philadelphia College of Art (now the University of The Arts). He has participated in exhibitions worldwide. As the former coordinator of FINCO Summer Art Workshops, and as a teacher and lecturer at Government High School and The College of the Bahamas (now the University of the Bahamas), Roberts has mentored generations of young Bahamian artists.

He, in 1991, with Brent Malone, Max Taylor, Stan Burnside, Jackson Burnside and John Beadle, founded "B-CAUSE" (Bahamian Creative Artists United for Serious Expression), an organization dedicated to the promotion of local art and artists. Roberts played a large role in the creation of the National Art Gallery of the Bahamas and holds a lifetime membership in the institution.

Roberts was Curator of the Central Bank of the Bahamas gallery for most of its existence, until 2017. Prior to the creation of the National Art Gallery of the Bahamas, the Central Bank's gallery was The Bahamas' preeminent exhibition space. Roberts has been a key driving and developmental force of the Annual Art Competition and Exhibition sponsored by the Central Bank. Since the competition's inception, in 1984, it is renowned as a rite of passage for young Bahamian artists, and counts among its awardees many of today's top Bahamian artists.

Roberts created a series of "sacred spaces" installations of female figures carved from dead but rooted trees. The first of these, at the Clifton Heritage National Park, consisting of 12 figures, marks one of the first landing sites of slaves in the Bahamas. The artist has since created similar installations at other sites, including at the Blake Road Welcome Centre, nearby the Lynden Pindling International Airport. In 2005, Roberts spent a month in Pietrasanta, Italy, working in marble and granite as part of the International Professional Artist Symposium and Exchange. In 2006, he was one of 45 international artists invited by the 8th Changchun China Symposium to create, over a 40-day period, while working in the same space, under that year's theme,"Peace, Friendship and Spring." His 12’ bronze sculpture, "Rebirth," is permanently installed in the Changchun World Sculpture Park. In 2009, as an open space designer and as a contribution to the Nassau Downtown Revitalization Programme, he produced the seven acre park at Centreville House, the location of the Antiquities Monuments & Museums Corporation's headquarters.

In 2011, Roberts participated in the Master Artists of The Bahamas Exhibition at the Waterloo Centre for the Arts, in Iowa. His artwork, "Bubbles" was installed as part of the expansion of the Lynden Pindling International Airport’s final phase, in 2013. He was Artist in Residence at Schooner Bay, Abaco, The Bahamas, for several years; and, in 2017, established a relationship with the Island School, in Eleuthera. He opened "Hillside House," an art gallery and studio on 25 Cumberland Street, in a restored centuries’ old historic building, which has become an active centre for the Bahamas's creative community. His ethos of connecting humanity's spiritual and emotional nature, and nature itself; and his desire to record and honour Bahamian heritage; are inherent in his paintings, sculpture, and creative pedagogy.

Roberts' work is in numerous worldwide collections. He lives and works in The Bahamas, and is a recipient of the E. Clement Bethel Award, from the University of the Bahamas, The Bahamas Ministry of Tourism's Cacique Award for the Arts, and The Bahamas Silver Jubilee Award.
