= Lavar Munroe =

Bahamian-American contemporary artist (born 1982)

- Born: 19 November 1982 (age 43); Nassau, Bahamas
- Education: Savannah College of Art and Design; Washington University in St. Louis
- Known for: Painting, drawing, sculpture, installation art
- Website: www.lavar-munroe.com

Lavar Munroe (b. Nassau, Bahamas, 1982) is a Bahamian-American artist, working primarily in painting, cardboard sculptural installations, and mixed media drawings. His work is often categorized as: a hybrid medium that straddle the line between sculpture and painting. Munroe lives and works in the United States.

== Early life ==
Lavar Munroe was born November 19, 1982, in Nassau, Bahamas where he resided in the community of Grants Town until age 21. In 2004, Munroe migrated to the United States for tertiary level education, where he remained until present.

== Background and career ==
In 2007, Munroe received his Bachelor of Fine Arts from the Savannah College of Art and Design. He obtained a Master of Fine Arts degree from the Sam Fox School of Design & Visual Arts at Washington University in St. Louis in 2013.

In 2014, he was awarded a postdoctoral research fellowship at the University of North Carolina at Chapel Hill. Munroe was included in Prospect.4: The Lotus in Spite of The Swamp, the New Orleans triennial curated by Trevor Schoonmaker, and the 12th Dakar Biennale, curated by Simon Njami, in Senegal. In 2015, Munroe's work was featured in All the World's Futures, curated by Okwui Enwezor as part of the 56th Venice Biennale. Noteworthy group shows include those at the Nasher Museum of Art in Durham; Perez Art Museum, Miami; the National Art Gallery of the Bahamas, Nassau; MAXXI Museum of Art, Rome; Museum of the African Diaspora, San Francisco; Virginia Museum of Contemporary Art, Virginia Beach; and the Drawing Center, New York.

Munroe was awarded residencies at the Skowhegan School of Painting and Sculpture, MacDowell Colony, the Headlands Center for the Arts, Joan Mitchell Center, Thread: Artist Residency and Cultural Center (a project of the Josef and Anni Albers Foundation) and was an inaugural Artists in Residence at the Norton Museum of Art. He is a recipient of the Joan Mitchell Foundation Painters and Sculptors Grant. Munroe represented The Bahamas at the 2010 Liverpool Biennial.

In April 2016, Munroe's ten-year survey SON OF THE SOIL debuted at the National Art Gallery of the Bahamas as the largest retrospective to date of Munroe's art, which spanned the artist's 10 years of work (2008-2018) and included nearly 50 original paintings, sculpture and drawings.

Munroe produces interdisciplinary artworks, and describes himself as a "trickster". He says he borrows from the narrative elements of illustration, theatre, and surrealist representations of ancient mythologies.

In 2023, Munroe was awarded a John Simon Guggenheim Memorial Foundation Fellowship. The actor and director Robert De Niro has underwritten Lavar Munroe’s Fellowship in Fine Arts in honor of his father, the painter Robert De Niro Sr., a 1968 Guggenheim Fellow.

Munroe lives and works between Baltimore, MD and Nassau, Bahamas.

== Work ==
Where Heroes Lay In 2013, Munroe produced a series of 12 life-sized cardboard beds titled "Where Heroes Lay" engaged a material exchange between the artist and a homeless person in downtown Washington, D.C. Munroe presented The Hero's soiled bedding material as a consumer good in the art-market, knowing that the objects would serve as weapons of critique and ridicule towards mainstream society."

Venice Biennale In 2015, Munroe was invited to exhibit in the 56th Venice Biennale: All The Worlds Futures, curated by the late by Okwui Enwezor. Munroe presented three large format paintings in the exhibition.

Human Zoo In 2014, Munroe was awarded a Postdoctoral Fellowship at The University of North Carolina at Chapel Hill. While there, his research interest was the human zoo.

Memorials

Munroe's 'Memorials' have taken on various forms, including but not limited to a ceramic funerary urn that Munroe created which housed his father's ashes, his father's soiled parachute which he sewed and braided prior to him being hospitalized, life-size erected sculptural forms, and mural sized wall drawings which symbolized dreams that foretold his father's death.

Gun Dogs

Munroe's ongoing series called 'Gun Dogs', comprise mostly life size cardboard sculptures of vicious dogs.

Redbones

The early inception of Munroe's Redbones Series is based on photo documents and artifacts collected in Senegal: Goree Island, Tambacounda, Saint Louis and the Sinthian Village.
