= Amos Ferguson =

Bahamian folk artist (1920–2009)

- Born: February 28, 1920; Exuma, Bahamas
- Died: October 19, 2009 (aged 89); Nassau, Bahamas
- Known for: folk art

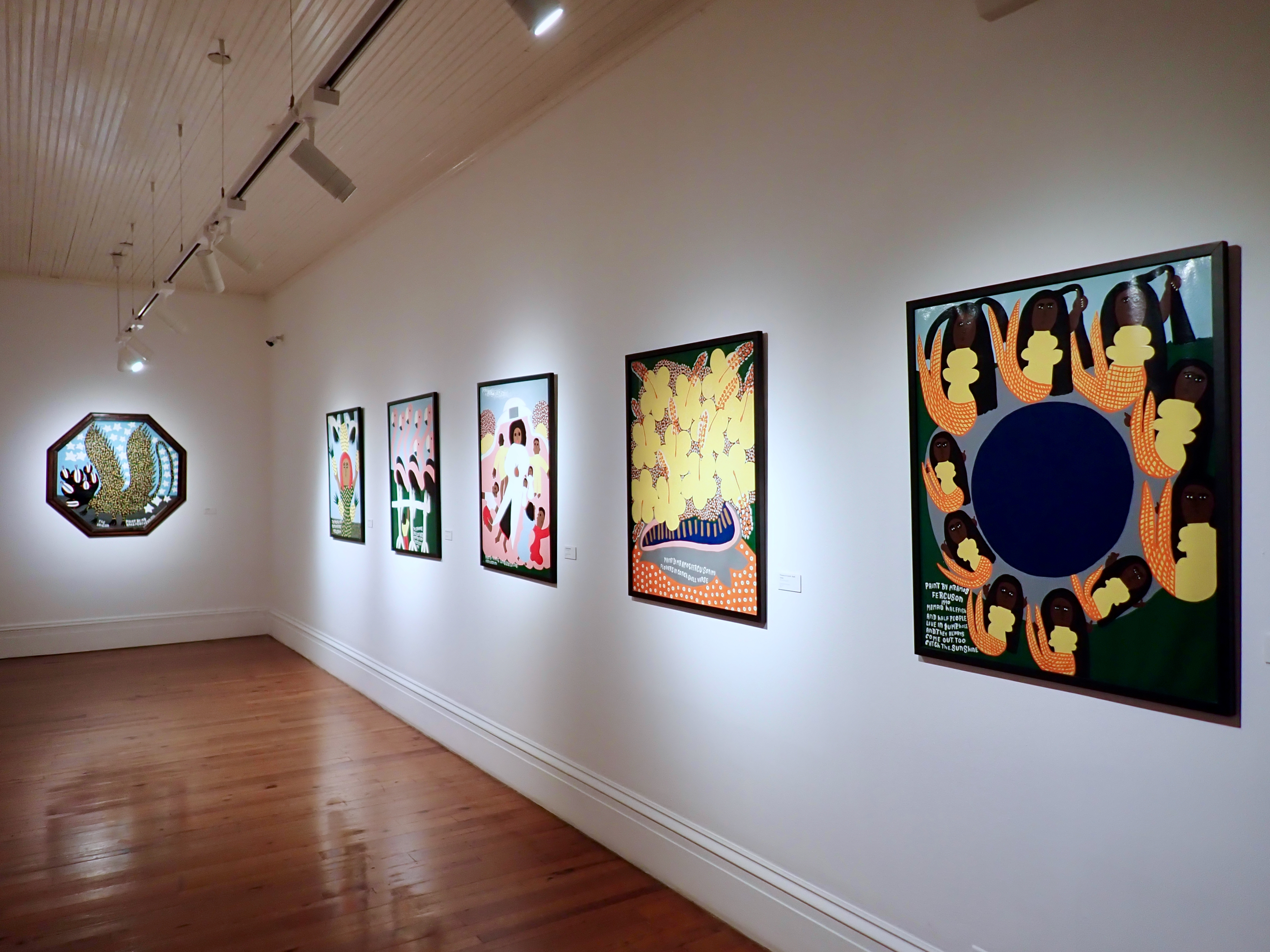
A selection of paintings by Ferguson in the permanent collection of the National Art Gallery of the Bahamas

Amos Ferguson (February 28, 1920 – October 19, 2009) was a Bahamian folk artist. He was known for his brilliantly coloured Bible stories and Bahamian scenes. He was nicknamed the "Picasso of Nassau".

== Life ==
Amos Ferguson was born on February 28, 1920, in Exuma, Bahamas. His father was a preacher, carpenter, and farmer. He was one of fourteen children.

Ferguson worked as an upholsterer, furniture finisher, artist and house painter. He wasn't trained as an artist, and was known as an outsider artist. Ferguson often said "I paint by faith, not by sight". His paintings, which have sold for as much as US$45,000, are displayed in galleries in the Bahamas, the United States, and in museums, and art galleries around the world.

In 2005, the street where he lived in Nassau was renamed "Amos Ferguson Street".

He died in Nassau on October 19, 2009.

== Work ==
Ferguson was known for his brilliantly coloured Bible stories and Bahamian scenes. Ferguson was a house painter by trade and did not become an artist until he was in his 40s. As he told the story, his nephew came to him and related a dream that he had just had. Jesus, the nephew said, came out of the sea with a picture in his hands and said that Ferguson was wasting his talent in painting. Ferguson heeded the call and painted with exterior enamel on cardboard, rendered Bible stories or Bahamian stories in Caribbean visual idiom.

He began showing at Bahamian galleries in 1972. Widespread recognition came to him in 1978 when Sukie Miller, an American collector, bought some of his paintings. His art debuted in the U.S. with a 1985 exhibition at the Wadsworth Atheneum, which featured 50 of his paintings. His images were later used to illustrate Under the Sunday Tree, a 1991 collection of poetry by Eloise Greenfield. Ferguson's official art gallery is located in Nassau, Bahamas. He often titled his paintings using unconventional grammar and spellings. He always signed his paintings with the phrase "Paint by Mr. Amos Ferguson".
