= Kendal Hanna =

Bahamian painter and sculptor (1936–2024)

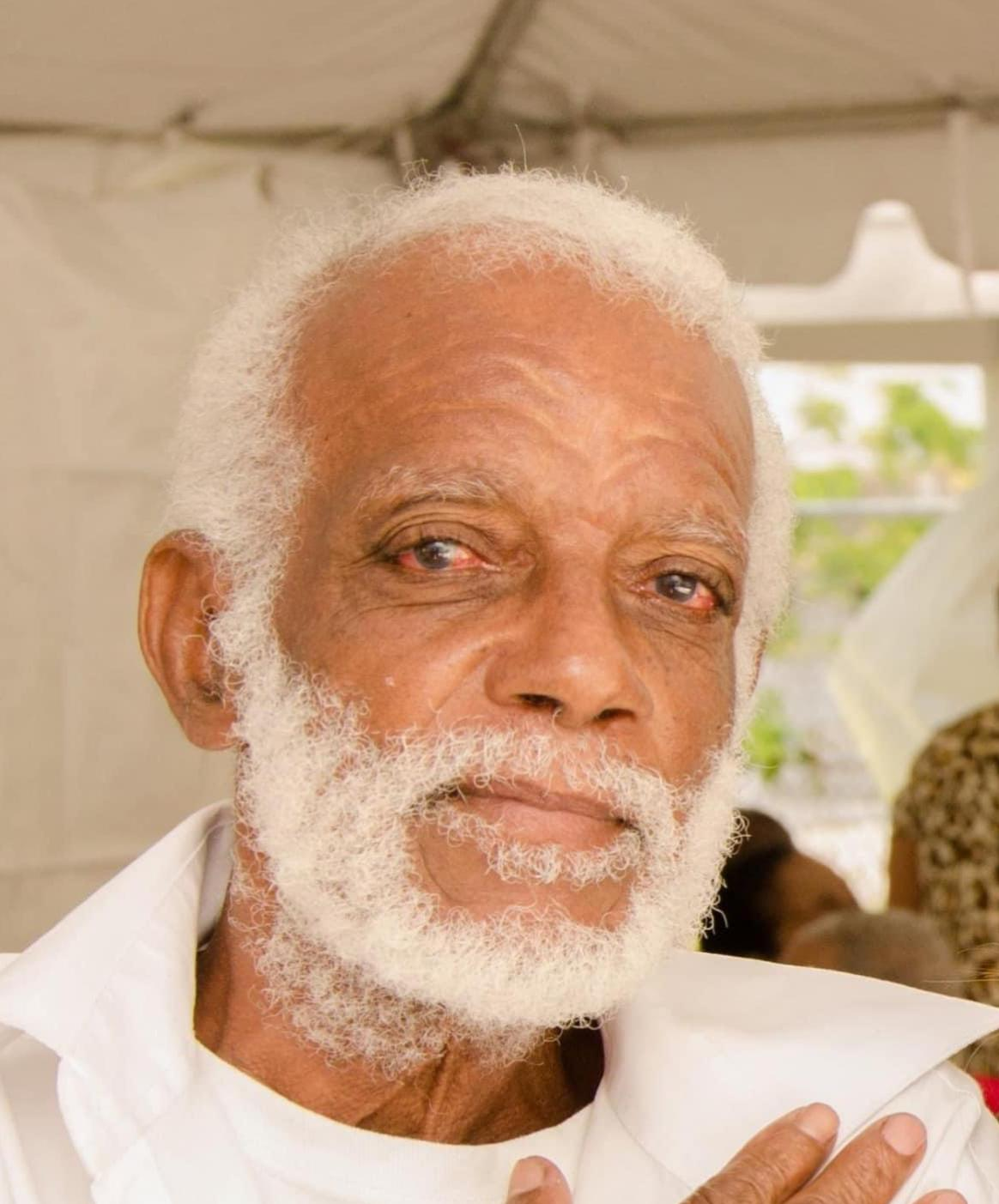
- Born: 25 June 1936; Nassau, Bahamas
- Died: 26 June 2024 (aged 88); Nassau, Bahamas
- Known for: Painting, Sculpture
- Movement: Abstract-Expressionism, Modernism

Kendal Alfred Hanna (25 June 1936 – 26 June 2024) was a Bahamian painter and sculptor known as one of The Bahamas’ first abstract expressionist. His works have been inspired by and compared to international artists and fellow abstractionists such as William de Kooning, Jackson Pollock, Hans Hoffman, Joan Miró and Mark Rothko.

The majority of his initial works in his career were black and white paintings but he worked more extensively in colour after being treated for schizophrenia in his late twenties. He describes his work as his “subconscious mind expressing itself on the canvas.”

His work is present in several private collections both locally and internationally and also in the National Collection of The Bahamas.

== Early life and education ==
Hanna was born in Nassau, Bahamas on 25 June 1936. He was the oldest child to Leonard “Jakes” Johnson and Mable Hanna

His interests in art began as a child in primary school. While working at the Customs Department and attending St. John's College high school, he met famous American muralist John St. John and began his first formal drawing lessons. Through the encouragement and mentoring of St. John, Hanna's dream to become an artist started to develop. He spent three weeks in Florida with the invitation of St John, using each other as live models and produced his first series of self-portraits. It also gave him the opportunity to visit his first museum, The Lowe Art Museum at the University of Miami in Gables, Florida. During that time, St. John shared with Hanna a small abstract painting in which he expressed an affinity to the work and the feeling and memory forever stuck with him. Though John St. John was not artist working in pure abstraction, Kendal Hanna cited him as one of the most influential artist on his life and also his career.

He later studied marine biology for a time and then worked at the Nassau General Post Office as a postal clerk. There he met Davis Rawnsley, an artist and aspiring potter from London, who had convinced him to visit the famous Chelsea Pottery after learning about Hanna's dream to start an art career. Kendal would visit the Pottery during his work breaks and ultimately left the establishment to become one of the first Bahamian artists to work at the famous Chelsea Pottery. However, after the decline of the Pottery and the death of his mother in 1959, Hanna eventually resigned and went to pursue a career as a painter.

In his early stages, his works were mostly figurative but he always had an experimental mind that ultimately was explored through Abstract Expressionism. While attending the Chelsea Pottery, he encountered more abstract pieces in the early 1990s in the form of ceramics and when asked by Charles Huggins whether the events influenced him, he replied: "It could have had some influence and did have some impact on me…(but) a lot has to do with the type of person I am. I believe I have an experimental mentality. I try to discover. Experiment and create something from an idea…I was in my twenties when I made the break…I have worked at it to develop it to the state it is today…”

In his early adulthood, Hanna, along with his friend Ron Stenson, decided to travel to the United States to discover more opportunities for employment and art production. They traveled to Florida and then New York City, where Hanna faced many hardships making it day to day being broke but also enjoying the freedom the new city had to offer.

He spent almost a year in New York, making new friends, both local people and artists, working in different establishments and visiting art museums. His experience in visiting museums such as The Museum of Modern Art, The Whitney Museum, The Metropolitan Museum, and the Guggenheim stayed with him throughout his career.

In the end, Hanna returned to The Bahamas, overstaying his visit and was deported after turning himself in to the police.

== Return to Nassau ==
It was in New York when Kendal Hanna noticed his mental health was being afflicted, but it was not until his return to Nassau that the signs of mental degeneration became evident to himself and his family. He was ultimately diagnosed with schizophrenia. As a result, he was institutionalized and prescribed a series of electric shock therapy treatments four times a week (a treatment that proved unsuccessful). Spending two years within the facility, he suffered physical and mental abuse. After his release, Hanna used art to recover his motor capabilities and mental acuity.

In the 1970s, about ten years after his mother's death, Hanna began working at the McAlpine Company and eventually married Norma Samuels. After his wedding and honeymoon, Hanna took in a vacation to Eleuthera, Bahamas without his wife. In the end, he saw his marriage as unconventional, and the two later separated after some time.

== First show and career ==
During the late 1980s, Kendal Hanna suffered an extreme loss when his home was destroyed in a fire and subsequently lost everything, including his artworks. He later lived with his friends Basil and Gloria Cooper and used that as an opportunity to start anew his artistic practice. This led him to have his first solo exhibition at The Bahamian Art Gallery (BAG) in 1992.

Hanna rented multiple spaces and apartments around Nassau, but it was not until 2007 where he found his permanent residence at PopopStudios, an independent artist run studio space and gallery. This decision helped him creatively speaking: a move Hanna called “perfect” that allowed him to produce and function being surrounded with artists.

In 2009, Kendal Hanna received the E. Clement Bethel Award from the College of the Bahamas for his significant contributions to Bahamian art.

On June 25, 2011, The National Art Gallery of The Bahamas honored Kendal Hanna with a retrospective titled ‘“Happy Birthday To Me’ Kendal Hanna: A Retrospective.” Formally known as the Villa Doyle, the 1860s colonial mansion was renovated in the 1990s and developed as a national museum and historical site where “history could be recognized, unpacked, and interpreted." It was timed to coincide with his 75th birthday and featured work that spanned his almost sixty-year career. With over 150 pieces of work present, Hanna's pieces encompassed classic nude studies, compelling abstract expressionist pieces and psychologically intense portraits.

During the time of his exhibition, Hanna reminisced on his memories of the historical Villa Doyle. He had never thought his paintings would be shown in the very building he would stroll past with his mother. “…it’s sort of unbelievable.”

In 2015, Kendal Hanna was chosen to exhibit in New York City at the Volta Fair.

A documentary featuring his life, career and work process entitled “Brigidy Bram” is in post-production.

== Work and process ==
Art was Hanna's way of coping with personal misfortunes and his continuous battle with mental illness. He believes his pieces function as a visual biography, inferring himself, his life, struggles, and passion to his audience using deliberate mark makings to tell the purest story of his life experience. He insists that his identity lives within the work: his identity as a black man and as a Bahamian.

Hanna's work is seen as personal and deeply psychological, portraying his fascination with representation and self-representation. In the catalog featuring his retrospective “Happy Birthday To Me,” he confessed the difficulty audiences have when engaging with his work and infers: “Everybody is more familiar with what is visible in an object, what the eye is focused on outwardly. When people express themselves like this, it does surprise them. It is my subconscious mind expressing itself on the canvas. People will be faced with the unknown…”

Though he is mostly categorized as a painter, many of his works incorporate mixed media elements and materials such as oils, crayons, and found objects. Hanna sees his work and his canvas as an extension of his own life. His methods of conceptualizations are meticulous and his process can take him hours before the mark making process has begun. He is well known to spend long periods of time on a single piece. One piece in particular, a self-portrait of a well-known acquaintance Vincent D’Aguilar, was constantly reworked and eventually relinquished to the buyer, to the dismay of Hanna. He spent two years working on that painting, and admitted that, while he was able to visualize his completed image, “as an abstractionist, how I work, the experience of my work and the timing are unpredictable.”

He also talked about the impact of Rorschach tests he took when he was in Sandilands and they became a part of his painting process when creating portraits: “For me using this form was about questioning…my doctor would have me do Rorschach tests, asking me what I saw and thought when each was presented. I became influenced by that process, held on to it and now incorporate it into my art…”

As the Yin/Yang symbol was used as a defining marker of their works produced as Chelsea Pottery, Hanna adopted the same principles in his paintings. He follows the principles of dark and light (Yin and Yang respectively) that is seen in his usage of colors, compositions and contrasting tones in paintings, drawings and sculptures. Hanna at times also grids that he keeps visible onto the painting that also reflect his methods of balancing chaos with order.

== Later life and death ==
Hanna remained in Nassau, Bahamas and worked from his studio at Popopstudios International Center of the Arts, which he occupied from 2007.

During his participation in the VOLTA Art Fair in New York, Hanna articulated his artistic philosophy, stating “Real curiosity in ideas, material, form and the environment, be it through drawing, sculpture or painting, and channeling that effort into hard work is the awesome responsibility and joy of an artist.”

Hanna died on 26 June 2024, one day after his 88th birthday.

== Solo exhibitions ==
- 2011: Happy Birthday to Me, Kendal Hanna A Retrospective. National Art Gallery of the Bahamas, Nassau, Bahamas
- 2007: One Man Show, Self Portrait of the Artist. New Providence Art and Antiques, Nassau, Bahamas
- 2006: Kendal Hanna @ 70. New Providence Art and Antiques, Nassau, Bahamas
- 2005: One Man Show, New Providence Art and Antiques, Nassau, Bahamas
- 2003: One Man’ s Vision. National Art Gallery of Bahamas, Nassau, Bahamas

== Selected exhibitions ==
- 2015: VOLTA NY. Pier 90, New York City
- 2014: Imago Mundi. Luciana Benetton Collection, Venice, Italy & Lincang, China.
- 2013: Master Artist of the Bahamas Exhibition. National Art Gallery of the Bahamas, Nassau, Bahamas
  - 40 Years of Bahamian Art Exhibition. National Art Gallery of the Bahamas, Nassau, Bahamas
  - 2 Points of Views. Popopstudios International Center for the Visual Arts, Nassau, Bahamas
  - Beg Borrow Steal! Liquid Courage Gallery, Nassau, Bahamas
  - Small Art Auction House 2. National Art Gallery of the Bahamas, Nassau, Bahamas
- 2012: 2012 Invitational. The Central Bank of the Bahamas Art Gallery, Nassau, Bahamas
- The Small Art Auction House. The Bahamas Historical Society Museum, Nassau, Bahamas
- Open Studios + Group Exhibition. Popopstudios International Center for the Visual Arts, Nassau, Bahamas
- Sixth National Exhibition (NE6 Kingdom Come). National Art Gallery of the Bahamas, Nassau, Bahamas
- 2011: Master Artist of the Bahamas Exhibition. Waterloo Museum, Waterloo Iowa
- 2009: Central Bank of the Bahamas Annual Art Exhibition
  - Fire’ Exhibition with Toby Lunn. Popopstudios International Center for the Visual Arts, Nassau, Bahamas
- 2008: Fourth National Exhibition. (NE4) National Art Gallery of the Bahamas, Nassau, Bahamas
- 2006: Third National Exhibition (NE3), National Art Gallery of the Bahamas, Nassau, Bahamas
- 2005: 9th Black Fine Arts Show, New York City
- 2004: Second National Exhibition (NE2). National Art Gallery of the Bahamas, Nassau, Bahamas
- 2003: Inaugural National Exhibition. National Art Gallery of the Bahamas
