= Clifton Heritage National Park =

National park in the Bahamas

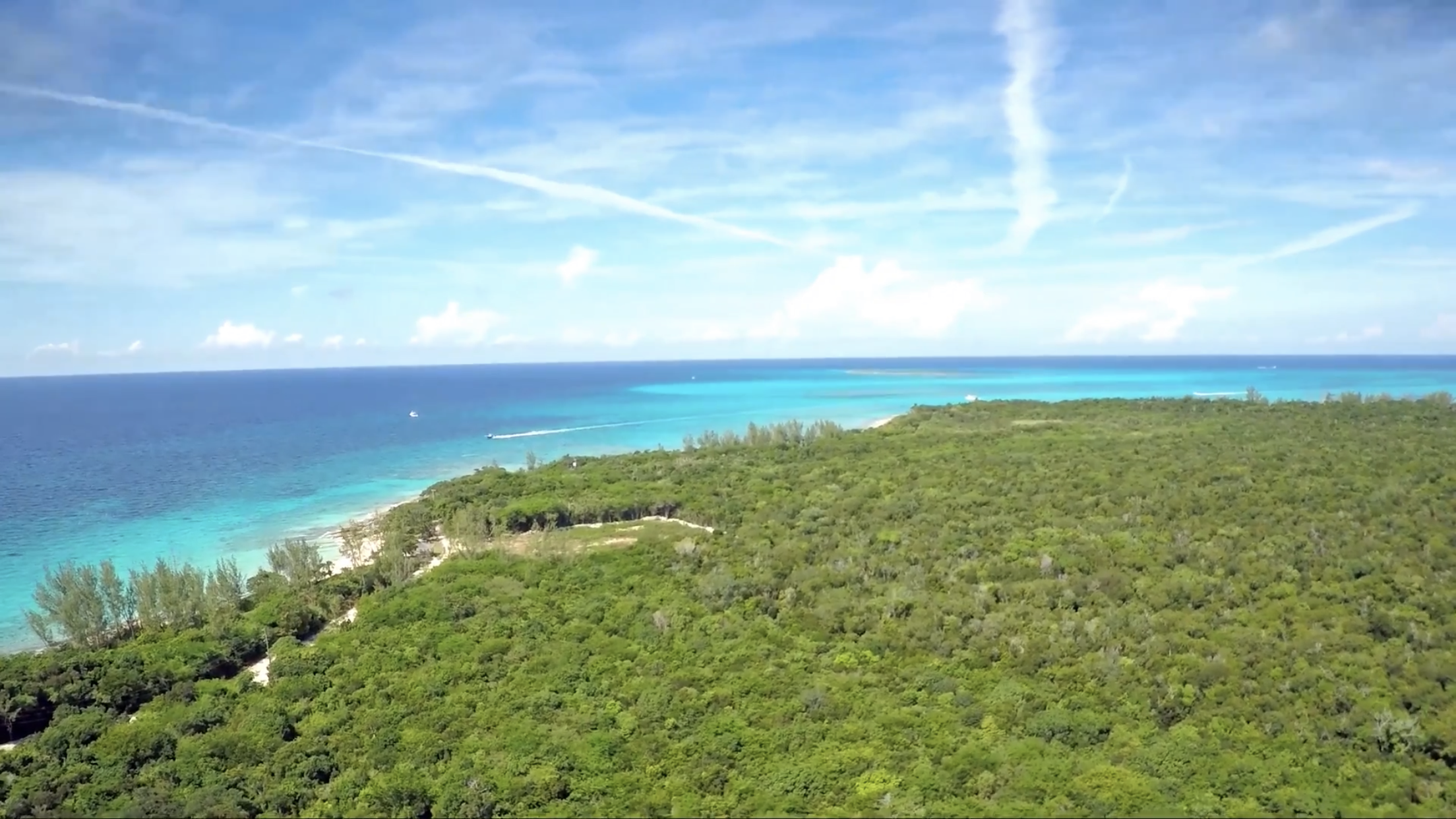
- Aerial view of Clifton on the western end of New Providence
- Interactive map of Clifton Heritage National Park
- Location: New Providence, the Bahamas
- Nearest city: Nassau
- Coordinates: 25.013°N 77.550°W
- Established: 2004
- Website: www.cliftonheritageauthority.com

Clifton Heritage National Park is a national park on the western end of New Providence Island in the Bahamas. It is managed by the Clifton Heritage Authority and has an area of 208 acres. Notable as tribute to the cultural history of the Bahamas, it was established as a protected area in June 2004 and opened to the public in April 2009.

== History and culture ==
Clifton was originally inhabited by the Indigenous Lucayans, and archaeological evidence of their presence dates back to 1100 AD. It was later occupied by buccaneers and freebooters. It became the site of a Loyalist plantation in the late 18th century, characterised as being remote from the hustle and bustle of Nassau. The great house was built by John Wood in 1788. The original architecture resembled that of Louisiana and South Carolina. It was later owned by William Wylly (or Whylly).

One of the ruins on the property is reportedly a tavern that was in use until the 1960s.

Laurie Wilkes of the University of California, Berkeley and Paul Farnsworth of Louisiana State University carried out archaeological investigations of the site in the 1990s. They were primarily interested in uncovering the slave quarters, home to as many as 67 slaves. They also found evidence of pre-Loyalist inhabitation by the Lucayans and during the Conch Period.

In 2000, there were plans to bulldoze and develop the site into a gated community with a golf course. This idea was met with strong opposition from locals and those who wished to preserve Clifton's history, thus the plans fell through. It was established as public protected land in 2004. In 2006, the Clifton Heritage Authority and the Florida Museum of Natural History conducted an expedition to further investigate the Lucayan sites found, which turned out to be one large site.

Historic and archaeological sites:

- Great House, now a ruin
- Carriage House, which was originally used as a stable and store house and is now used as the gift shop
- Slave village
- Pirate Steps

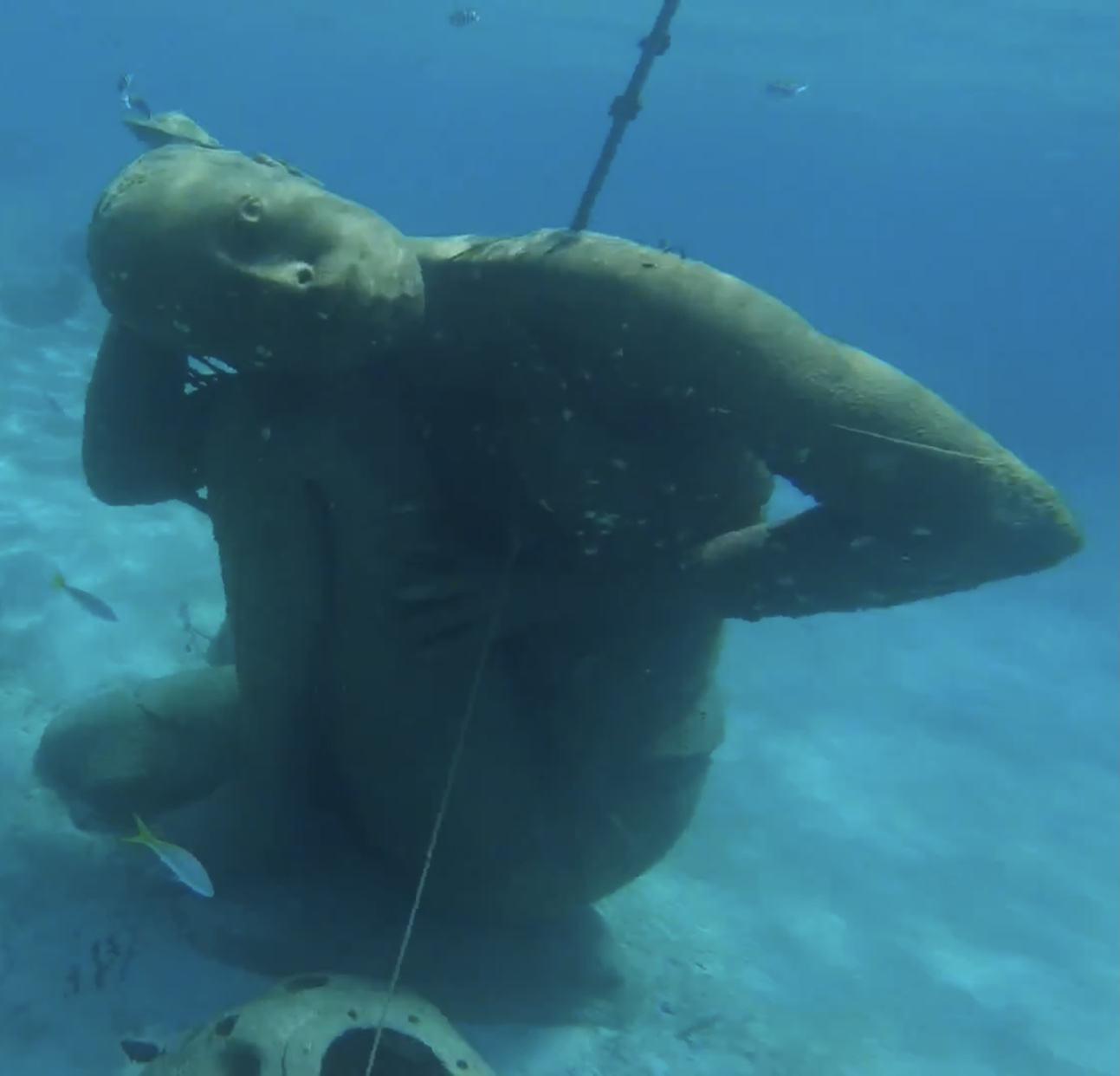
Ocean Atlas

Art and monuments:

- The Sacred Space, also known as the Genesis Garden, was created in a joint effort by Bahamian artists Antonius Roberts and Tyrone Ferguson. The wooden sculptures are to honour and remember the slaves who were brought there.
- Sir Nicholas Nuttall Coral Reef Sculpture Garden, underwater sculptures installed in 2014 including:
  - Ocean Atlas by Jason deCaires Taylor
  - Virtuoso Man by Willicey Tynes
  - Lucayan Faces by Andret John
- James Bond plane wreck
- Lucayan Village, built in 2019
- Da' Story Telling Area hosts live skits

== Nature ==
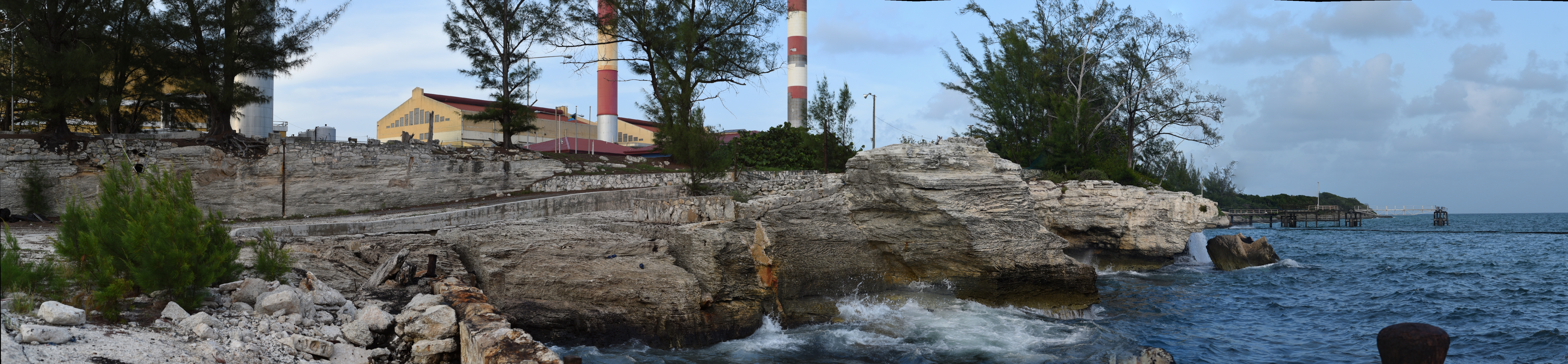
Rocky Coastline at Clifton Pier

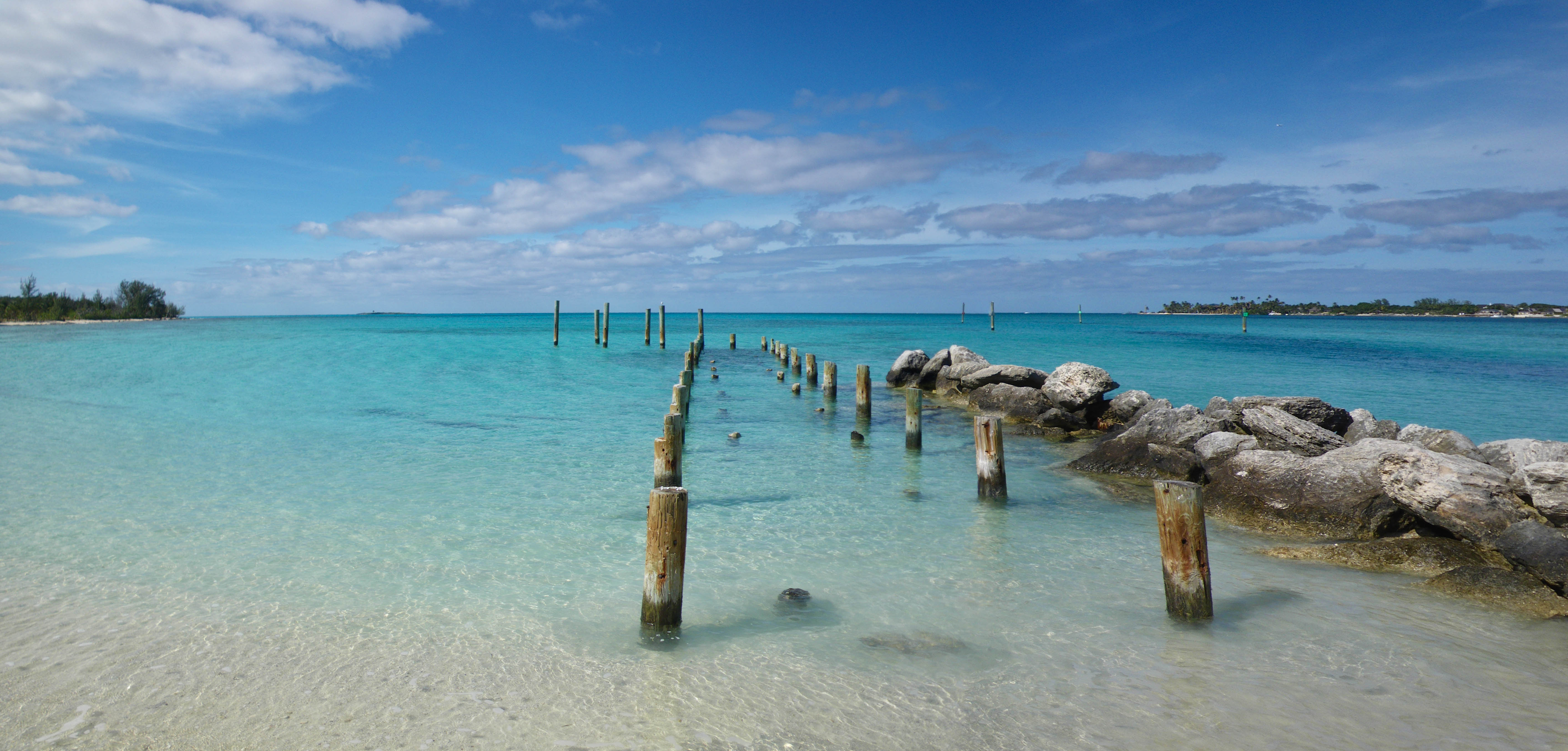
Jaws Beach

Clifton Park has a rocky coastline referred to as Turtle Pen due to the presence of turtles in its waters. Beaches include:

- Jaws Beach
- Flipper Beach
- Snorkel site
- Johnston Beach, which featured in the 2018 Bachelorette

The banana hole is a natural feature and is said to have been a spiritual place for the Lucayans. Local fauna includes songbirds, wading birds, and seabirds.
