= Blue Curry =

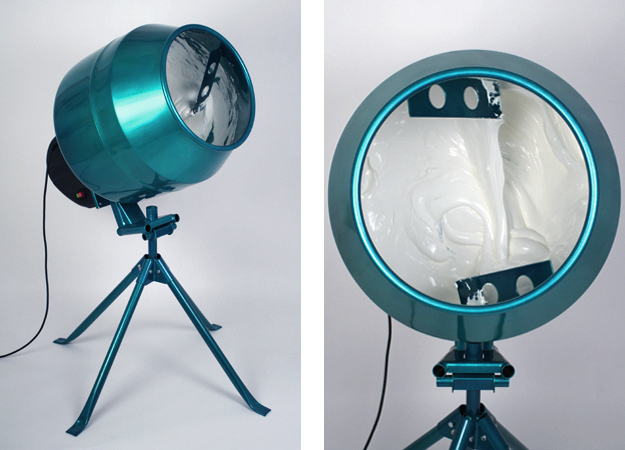
Untitled artwork by artist Blue Curry using a customised cement mixer filled with sun cream for the sixth Liverpool Biennial

Blue Curry (b. Nassau, Bahamas, 1974) is a Bahamian artist living and working in London, specialising in sculptural assemblage and installation art.

== Education ==
Curry is a graduate of the MFA Fine Art program at Goldsmiths College, London, where his final show was listed as one of the ten best in the country by a former editor of Art Review.

== Career ==
Curry was profiled in a BBC documentary Goldsmiths: But is it Art? which charted his progress through art college and his experiences on the London contemporary art scene.

In one of his earliest works, Curry transported almost a ton of sand to Germany for exhibition and then returned it to the beach it came from in the Bahamas for the group show "Funky Nassau" at the Nassauischer Art Association, Germany. He has also shown work at Art Basel Miami Beach, the Art Museum of the Americas, Washington D.C. and the Musée International des Arts Modestes, France.

He has work in the collections of the National Art Gallery of The Bahamas, the Principal Art Group and many private collections. He has been a member of the Popop collective of artists since 2000.

== Reception ==
Curry was selected for inclusion in the Catlin Guide to the 40 important emerging artists in the UK in 2010 and listed as one of The Independent's "Future Art Stars".

Adrian Searle, chief art critic of The Guardian said that Curry's "swanky electric-blue cement mixer" installation filled with coconut sun cream might be a place for him to stick his head to soothe away his doubts about the 2010 Liverpool Bienniall.

== Exhibitions ==
- 2021 | Life Between Islands: Caribbean-British Art 1950s – Now. Tate Britain.
- 2021 | When the Globe is Home, Imago Mundi - Luciano Benetton Collection, Gallerie delle Prigioni, Treviso, Italy.
- 2021 | Here Be Dragons:a Reprise, Copperfield, London.
- 2020 | Mutadis Mutandis - 24 Pavilions, Giardini Projects, Studio Giardini, Venice, Italy.
- 2020 | The Frangenberg Collection Exhibition, Wolfson College, Cambridge.
- 2020 | Featured artist, MOCA London Web Exhibitions.
- 2020 | Visual Life of Social Affliction, a Small Axe Project, NEST, Rotterdam.
- 2019 | Visual Life of Social Affliction, a Small Axe Project, National Art Gallery of the Bahamas.
- 2019 | Visual Life of Social Affliction', a Small Axe Project, The Little Haiti Cultural Center, Miami.
- 2019 | The Empire Remains Shop, Grand Union, Birmingham.
- 2019 | Foreign Matter, duo exhibition with Fernando Martin Godoy, SCAN, London.
- 2019 | Relational Undercurrents: Contemporary Art of the Caribbean Archipelago, Delaware Art Museum.
- 2019 | Relational Undercurrents: Contemporary Art of the Caribbean Archipelago, Portland Museum of Art, Portland, Oregon.
- 2019 | Decoys and Deadheads, Werft 77, Dusseldorf, Germany.
- 2019 | Single-Use Planet, The International Development Bank Cultural Center, Washington D.C.
- 2018 | J Bar, NLS, Kingston, Jamaica. (solo)
- 2018 | Designer Exotics, FABRIKKEN, Copenhagen, Denmark.
- 2018 | I’m Not Who You Think I’m Not, Akademie de Kunste Studio, 10th Berlin Biennial event curated by Chris Cozier.
- 2018 | Relational Undercurrents: Contemporary Art of the Caribbean Archipelago, The Wallach Art Gallery, Columbia University, New York.
- 2018 | New Relics, Thames-Side Studios Gallery, London.
- 2017 | Relational Undercurrents: Contemporary Art of the Caribbean Archipelago, The Frost Art Museum, Miami, Florida.
- 2017 | Pacific Standard Time: LA/LA. Relational Undercurrents: Contemporary Art of the Caribbean Archipelago, Museum of Latin American Art, Long Beach, California.
- 2017 | Übersee, Halle 14, Leipzig, Germany.
- 2017 | TRIGGERED, Casa Quien, Santo Domingo, Dominican Republic.
- 2017 | Full Service, Five Years, London.
- 2016 | Dimensión Caribe, Centro León, Santiago, Dominican Republic. (solo)
- 2016 | Solo Presentation, Platform 102, Brussels, Belgium. (solo)
- 2016 | out of place, Alice Yard, Port of Spain, Trinidad.
- 2016 | The Empire Remains Shop, Baker Street, London.
- 2016 | 2nd Gran Bienal Tropical, curated by Marina Reyes Franco and Pablo Leon de la Barra, Kiosko La Comay, Puerto Rico.
- 2016 | Open Air Prisons: Las Antillas por los Antillanos, Los Angeles Contemporary Exhibitions, California.
- 2016 | The Explorers, Shoreditch Gallery Space, London.
- 2015 | Sunscreen, an online commission by EM15 for the 56th Venice Biennale.
- 2015 | The Presence of Absence, Berloni, London.
- 2015 | Studio Voltaire Open, selected by Cory Arcangel and Hanne Mugaas, Studio Voltaire, London.
- 2014 | Souvenir, Vitrine Gallery, Bermondsey. (solo)
- 2014 | Unsettled Landscapes: New Perspectives on Art of the Americas, SITE Santa Fe, New Mexico.
- 2014 | Jamaica Biennial, National Gallery of Jamaica, Kingston, Jamaica.
- 2014 | Numbered Days, duo exhibition with Aglae Bassens, CONVOY, London.
- 2014 | Show Off, LeandaKateLouise Projects, London.
- 2014 | Future Memories, 14°N 61°W, Martinique.
- 2014 | Curated by Paul Smith & Friends', Paul Smith, No. 11 Albemarle Street, London.
- 2014 | RE002_We Were All Rocks Once, Sorbus Gallery, Helsinki.
- 2013 | Duo show with Ingo Gerken, LoBe, Berlin.
- 2013 | 40 years of Bahamian Art, National Art Gallery of The Bahamas.
- 2013 | Creekside Open selected by Paul Noble, A.P.T., London.
- 2013 | The West 10th Window, Time Equities Art in Buildings Program, New York. (solo)
- 2013 | Misuse: Creating Alternatives, Cass Gallery, London.
- 2013 | Legacy: Five Schemes, First Variation, KARST Projects, High Cross House, Devon.
- 2012 | Zu Hause/At Home, LoBe, Berlin.
- 2012 | Confined, NEST, The Hague, the Netherlands.
- 2012 | Friday Late: Flying High, Victoria and Albert Museum, London.
- 2012 | Earth Works, P.P.O.W. Gallery, New York.
- 2012 | The Global Caribbean, Foundation Clément, Martinique.
- 2012 | Year One, Toomer Labzda, New York.
- 2012 | New Works, AF Projects, London. (solo)
- 2012 | Tryouts, Down Stairs Gallery, Great Brampton House, Herefordshire.
- 2012 | Into the Mix, Kentucky Museum of Art and Craft, Louisville, Kentucky.
- 2012 | Mad March Hares, Vegas Gallery, London.
- 2012 | Powerless Structures, Schwartz Gallery, London.
- 2011 | Stranger than Paradise, Nassauischer Kunstverein, Wiesbaden, Germany. (solo)
- 2011 | Solo Presentation, Toomer Labzda, New York. (solo)
- 2011 | Emergency5, Aspex, Portsmouth.
- 2011 | About Change in the Caribbean and Latin America, The World Bank, Washington DC.
- 2011 | Wrestling with the Image, Art Museum of the Americas, Washington DC.
- 2011 | Terms of Decision, Visual Arts Platform, Austrian Cultural Forum, London.
- 2011 | Caribes Globales, Museo de Arte Contemporaneo, Puerto Rico.
- 2011 | Trove, Deptford X, London. (solo)
- 2011 | Modern Frustrations, Sumarria Lunn Gallery, London.
- 2011 | Vessel, Stonehouse, Plymouth.
- 2011 | Assembly, Bearspace, London.
- 2011 | Dragging Anchor, Low&High, Folkestone Triennial Fringe, Folkestone. (solo)
- 2011 | So Here We Are, Kunstverein Speyer, Germany.
- 2011 | Duo Exhibition, Nextex, St. Gallen, Switzerland.
- 2010 | City States, 6th Liverpool Biennial, Contemporary Urban Centre, Liverpool.
- 2010 | 1st Triennial of Caribbean Art, Museo de Arte Moderno, Dominican Republic.
- 2010 | Anticipation, Selfridges Ultralounge, London.
- 2010 | NE5: Fifth National Exhibition, National Art Gallery of The Bahamas.
- 2010 | Nowhere in Peculiar, Five Hundred Dollars Gallery, London.
- 2010 | Stardust Boogie Woogie, Monica Bobinska Gallery, London.
- 2010 | Global Caraïbes, Musée International des Arts Modestes, Sète, France.
- 2010 | The Assistant, Bearspace, London.
- 2009 | The Global Caribbean, Art Basel Miami Beach.
- 2009 | Rockstone and Bootheel, Real Art Ways, Connecticut.
- 2009 | SoShow!, ShopAt34, London.
- 2009 | I Know a Friend That Knows a Friend, Het Poortgebouw, Rotterdam.
- 2009 | Hack Gold, (Space) Project Space, London.
- 2009 | Group Grope, Area 10, London.
- 2009 | R.I.P, Peacock Projects, London.
- 2009 | Collections Within Collections, National Art Gallery of The Bahamas.
- 2008 | 4th National Exhibition, National Art Gallery of The Bahamas.
- 2008 | Carifesta, Caribbean Festival of the Arts, Georgetown, Guyana.
- 2008 | Setups Situations Solutions, Popopstudios, Bahamas.
- 2007 | Into Position, Bauernmarkt 9, Vienna.
- 2007 | Work!, Diaspora Vibe Gallery, Miami.
- 2007 | The Next Level Guerilla Show, Photographers' Gallery, London.
- 2007 | Domesticalia: The Politics of Repression’, Standpoint Gallery, London.
- 2007 | Bahamian Art: Pre-Columbian to the Present, National Art Gallery of The Bahamas.
- 2006 | Funky Nassau: Recovering an Identity, Nassauischer Kunstverein, Germany & National Art Gallery of The Bahamas.
- 2006 | Exit, Popopstudios, Bahamas.
- 2006 | 3rd National Exhibition, National Art Gallery of The Bahamas.
- 2006 | Debris, (with Heino Schmid) Nassau, Bahamas.
- 2005 | Alumni Art Exhibition, Tang Gallery, Skidmore College, New York.
- 2005 | Interim, The Muse Gallery, London.
- 2005 | National Collection Exhibition, National Art Gallery of The Bahamas.
- 2005 | Love, Popopstudios, Bahamas.
- 2004 | 2nd National Exhibition, National Art Gallery of The Bahamas.
- 2004 | Survey of Contemporary Bahamian Art, National Art Gallery of The Bahamas.

== Bibliography ==
- A-Z of Caribbean Art, Robert & Christopher Publishers, Trinidad & Tobago, 2019.
- Beyond Representation in Contemporary Caribbean Art: Space, Politics and the Public Sphere, Carlos Garrido Castellano, Rutgers University Press, 2019.
- PRŌTOCOLLUM - Global Perspectives on Visual Vocabulary, 2015/16 edition, Dickersbach Kunstverlag, 2015.
- The Sense of Movement: When Artists Travel, BMW Art Journey series, Hatje Cantz, 2015.
- "Island Life", frieze (magazine), No 162, April 2014.
- "Blue Curry: When the Ships Come In", Michael Abatemarco, The Santa Fe New Mexican, July 18, 2014.
- "Conceptual Materialism: Installation Art and the Dismantling of Caribbean Historicism", Carlos Garrido Castellano, Third Text, vol 28 Issue 2, 2014.
- "Blue Curry and his Paradox Machine", Juan Carlos Betancourt, Arte Por Excelencias, Issue 16, 2013.
- De los últimos creadores de mapas: Pensamiento crítico y exposiciones colectivas de arte caribeño contemporáneo (1990-2011), Dominique Brèbion and Carlos Garrido Castellano, Alpedrete (Madrid), 2012.
- "Blue Curry: Art, Image, and Objecthood", Dr. Erica James, ARC Magazine, October 2012.
- "Hinter der Schlangenhaut", Frankfurter Allgemeine Zeitung, 6 June 2011.
- "Stranger than Paradise", Caribbean Review of Books, November 2010.
- Beyond the Tropical Veneer: Sun Cream and the Aesthetics of Leisure, NN [Arbeitstitel]/NN [Working Title], Forum Stadtpark Publications, Graz, Austria, 2010.
- The Catlin Guide 2010: New Artists in the UK. Justin Hammond ed., Catlin Ltd., 2010.
- Art in the Caribbean: An Introduction, Anne Walmsley & Stanley Greaves, London: New Beacon Books, 2010.
- "World-Class Exhibit Focuses on the Art of the Caribbean", Miami New Times, January 14, 2010.
- "New Caribbean Art by 23 Artists Showcased During Art Basel Fair", Jennifer Kay, Associated Press, December 4, 2009.
- "Colorful, Witty, Noisy: A West Indies Mélange", The New York Times, December 6, 2009.
- "Repairwork, Artist Contribution", Small Axe, vol 12 no. 2, June 2008.
- "Bahamian Art Goes Beyond Tourist Trade", The Miami Herald, August 19, 2007.
- "When Art Offends", The Nassau Guardian, July 14, 2007.
- "No Abstract Art Here: The Problem of the Visual in Contemporary Anglo-Caribbean Art", Small Axe, Vol. 11, No. 2, June 2007.
- Debris, Self Publication (with Heino Schmid), Susak Press, London, 2006.
- "Like Taking Sand to the Beach", Next Level, May 2006.
- "Blut, Sand, Wasser", Frankfurter Allgemeine Zeitung, April 12, 2006.
- "Relax? Just do it", Spike Art Quarterly, Summer edition, 2006.
