= April Bey =

American artist (b. 1987)

- Born: 1987 (age 38–39); Bahamas
- Education: BFA, Ball State University (2009); MFA, California State University, Northridge (2014)
- Known for: Contemporary visual art

April Bey (born 1987) is a Bahamian American contemporary visual artist and educator. She is known for her mixed media work which creates commentary on contemporary Black female rhetoric.

== Early life and education ==
April Bey grew up on the island New Providence in the Bahamas. She earned a BFA degree in drawing in 2009 from Ball State University, and an MFA in painting in 2014 at California State University, Northridge.

== Career ==
Bey's collage work intertwines a host of materials such as caulking, resin, wood and fabric. Focusing on Black women, Bey captures passion and strength, power and sensuality in her work, which explores the resilience of women and the hypocrisy of societal expectations where women are concerned. Bey uses photographic images of Black female figures in contemporary culture such as Chimamanda Ngozi Adichie, Solange, Issa Rae, and Michaela Coel with text overlaid which speaks of the narratives Black women are currently creating about their identity. Her work has been exhibited at Band of Vices Gallery, Coagula Curatorial, Liquid Courage Gallery and Barnsdall Art Park's Municipal Art Gallery.

She is a tenured professor in the department of studio arts at Glendale Community College.

April Bey's first solo museum exhibition titled, Atlantica, The Gilda Region opened on May 26, 2021, in Los Angeles at the California African American Museum. It is an immersive installation that discusses Afrofuturism, queerness, feminism, and internet culture in Black America.

== See also ==
- List of Bahamian women artists
