= Brent Malone =

Bahamian artist

- Born: 17 December 1941; Nassau, Bahamas
- Died: 25 February 2004 (aged 62); Nassau, Bahamas
- Known for: Painting, pottery

Richard Brent Malone, MBE (17 December 1941 – 25 February 2004) was a Bahamian photorealist painter and gallery owner.

A native of Nassau, Malone began his career as a potter, working as an apprentice at the Bahamian branch of the Chelsea Pottery. He had previously studied at Don Russell's Academy of Fine Arts, and would later travel to England for further study, planning to attend Ravensbourne College to gain teaching credentials. He also studied at the Beckenham School of Art.

In 1964, Malone was invited by Sir Harold Christie to return to Nassau to become the director of a new incarnation of the Chelsea Pottery. Called the Bahamian Pottery, it opened in 1964 but soon closed. Nevertheless, the experience helped Malone in his later work as a gallery owner. He owned a number of galleries throughout his life, including the Loft Gallery, Matinee Gallery, Temple Gallery, and Marlborough Antiques. All served as important exhibition spaces for young Bahamian artists, whose work Malone supported for much of his career.

In 1991, Malone, Antonius Roberts, Max Taylor, Stan Burnside, Jackson Burnside and John Beadle founded the group B.-C.A.U.S.E, dedicated to the promotion of Bahamian art. Malone was also a supporter of the Junkanoo festivities, and depicted them in many of his paintings. His style, though basically photorealistic, contained elements of surrealism as well.

Malone died of a heart attack in a Nassau hospital in 2004.
