= University of The Bahamas =

University in the Bahamas

Coordinates: 25.061709°N 77.353251°W

- Motto: Knowledge, Truth, Integrity
- Type: Public
- Established: 1974
- President: Dr. Robert J. Blaine III
- Academic staff: 294
- Students: 8722
- Location: Nassau, New Providence, Bahamas
- Campus: Urban
- Sports nickname: Mingoes
- Website: www.ub.edu.bs

The University of The Bahamas (UB) is the national public institution of higher education in the Commonwealth of The Bahamas with campuses throughout the archipelago. The main campus is located in the capital city of Nassau, on the island of New Providence.

The University of The Bahamas has about 5,000 students and over 12,000 alumni. It is one of the largest employers in the Bahamas, employing 700 faculty and staff. Seventy-six percent of the over 300 faculty (261 full-time and 96 part-time) are Bahamian.

== History ==
The university's former seal until 2016

The University of The Bahamas was established on 10 November 2016 following the Parliament of the Bahamas passing the University of The Bahamas Act which reorganized the College of The Bahamas into a university. The precursor College of The Bahamas was established in 1974 also by an act of parliament, and it was created through the merger of The Bahamas Teachers' College, The San Salvador Teachers' College, The C. R. Walker Technical College, and the Sixth Form Programme of the Government High School.

== Campuses ==
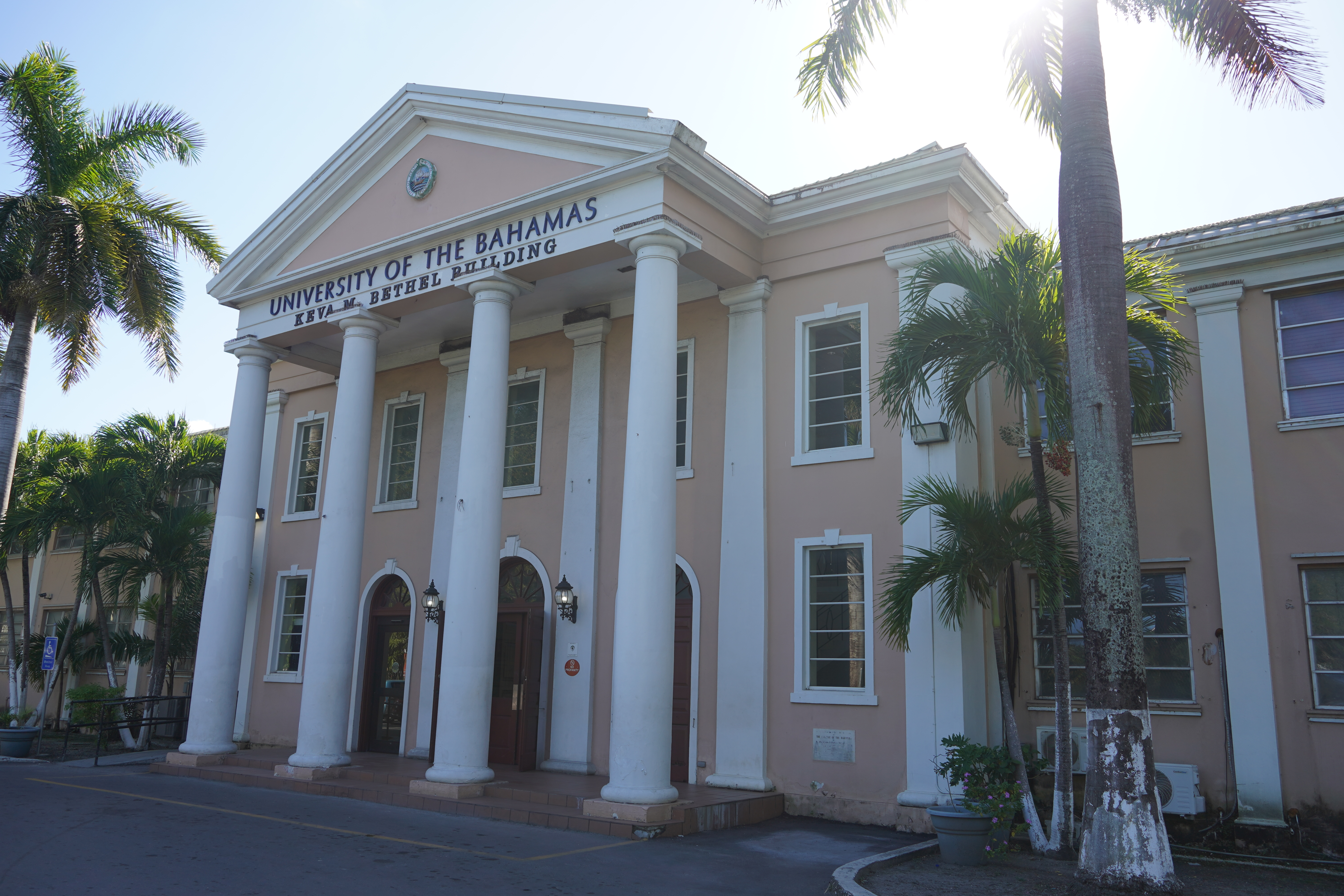
The Keva Building, named for Keva Bethel, is at the university main entrance

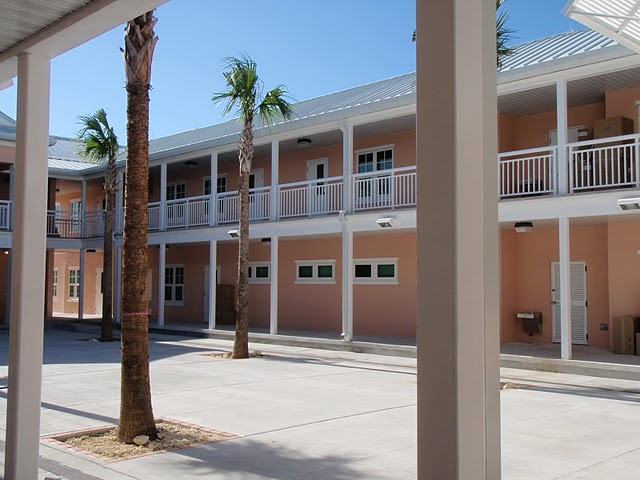
Northern Bahamas campus

The university has three academic campuses and several teaching and academic research centres throughout the Bahamas. The Oakes Field and Grosvenor Close Campus, housing the Division of Nursing and Health Sciences, are both in Nassau. The Northern Campus is near Freeport on Grand Bahama.

The Northern Campus opened in 2011 as part of a planned university community 10 kilometers east of Port Lucaya and 15 kilometers east of Freeport. Operating initially with only the first two buildings, the campus will feature classrooms, faculty offices, library, computer and science labs, bookstore, cafeteria, conference room and administrative offices. Future development includes signature buildings, student and faculty housing, specialized instructional, academic and office spaces, commercial and dining spaces and athletic facilities.

New facilities on New Providence are planned for:

- The Small Island Sustainability Centre, housing multidisciplinary sustainability programs focusing on issues unique to small island economies
- The Franklyn Wilson Graduate Business Centre, housing The Faculty of Business, including both graduate and undergraduate Schools of Business

Satellite campuses serve students throughout the archipelago in Abaco, Andros, Exuma and San Salvador.

The college opened an agricultural location in Andros in 2014.

== Institutes and Research Centres ==
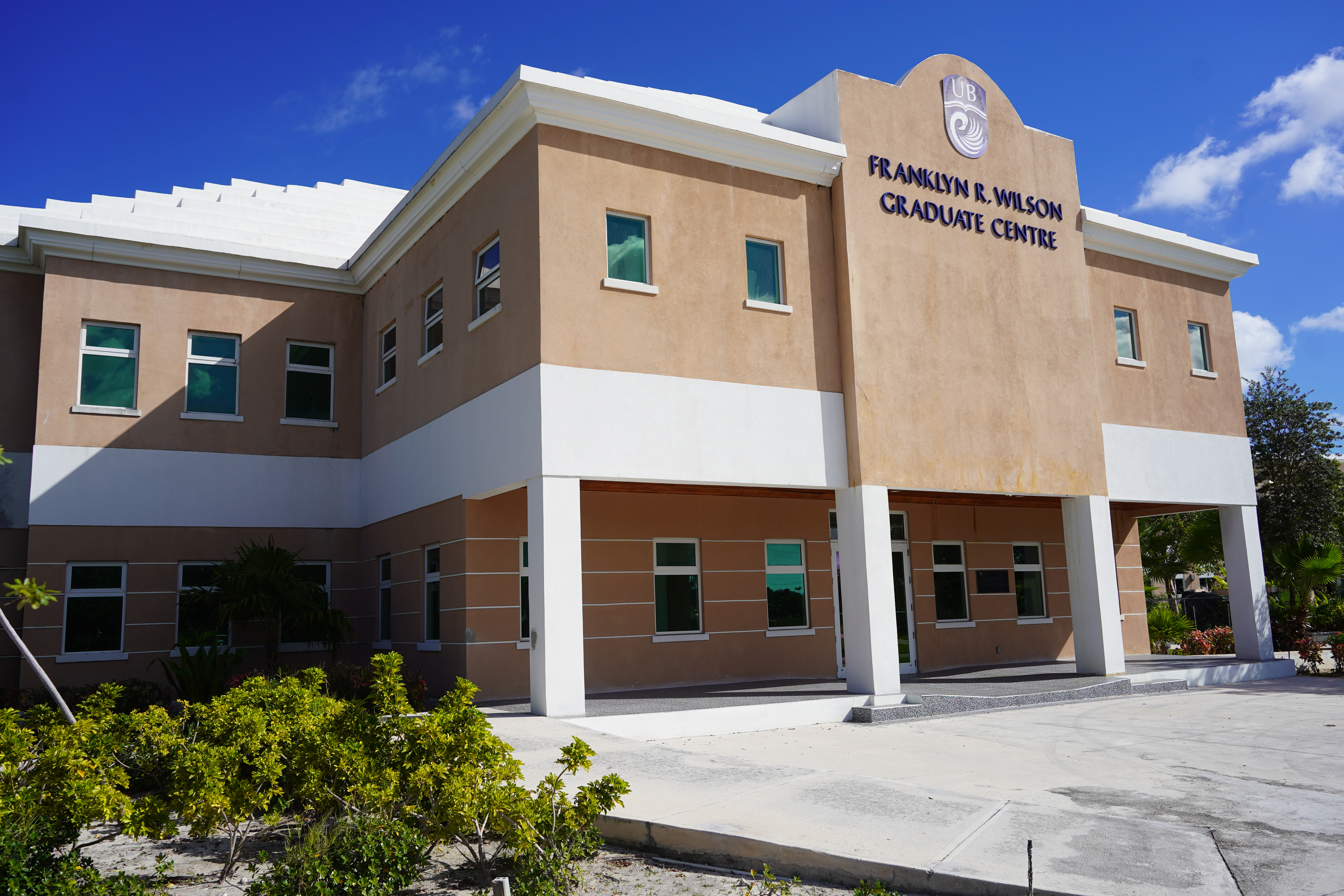
F. R. Wilson Graduate Centre

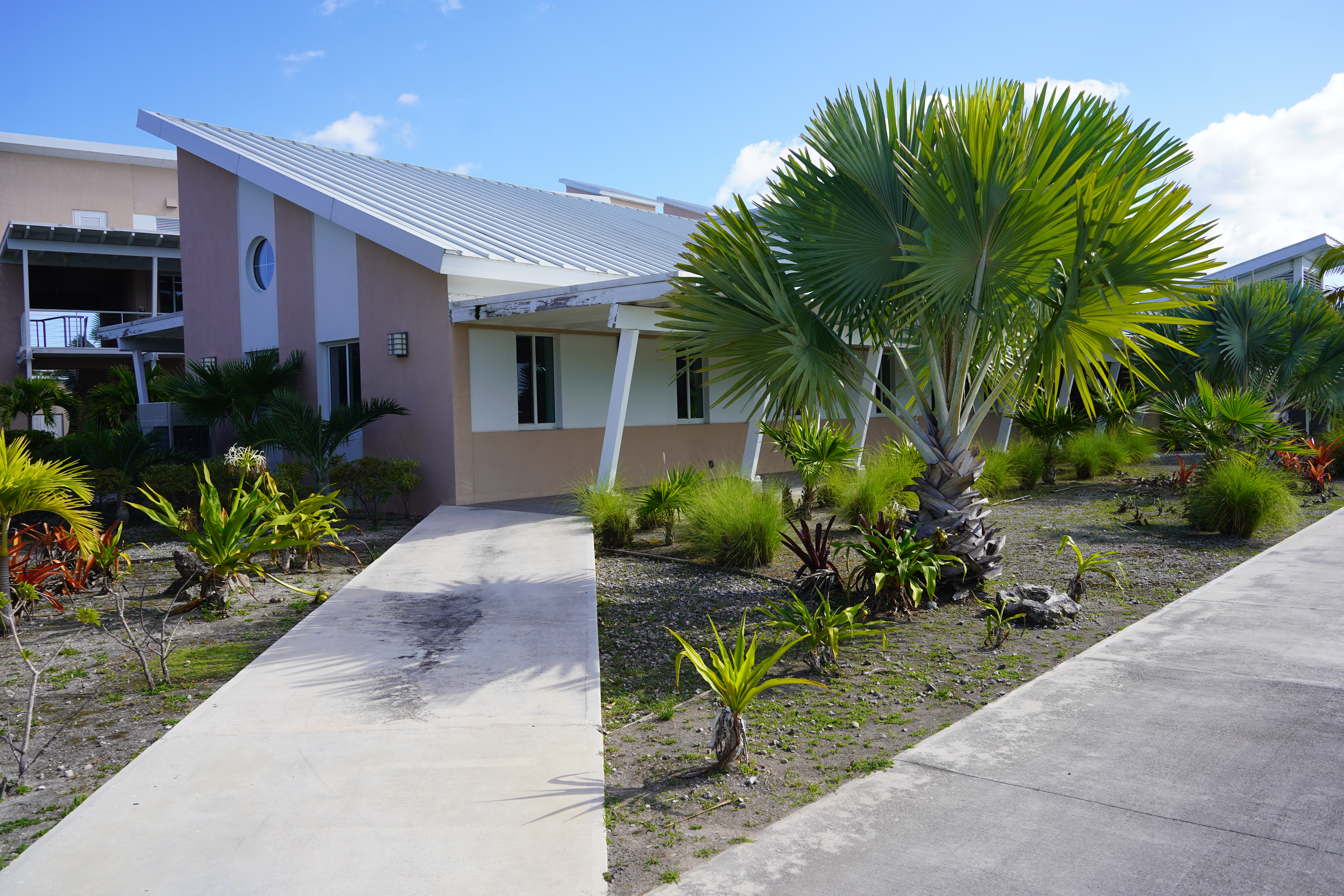
G.T.R. Campbell Small Island Sustainability Research Complex

The university's academic and outreach centres include:

- The Centre for Continuing Education and Extension Services
- The Abaco Center
- The Exuma Center
- The COB/Cape Eleuthera Institute
- Oral History Institute
- Confucius Institute
- Agricultural and Marine Science Institute (2014)

Research Centers include:

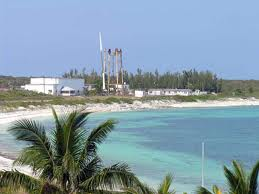
Gerace Center

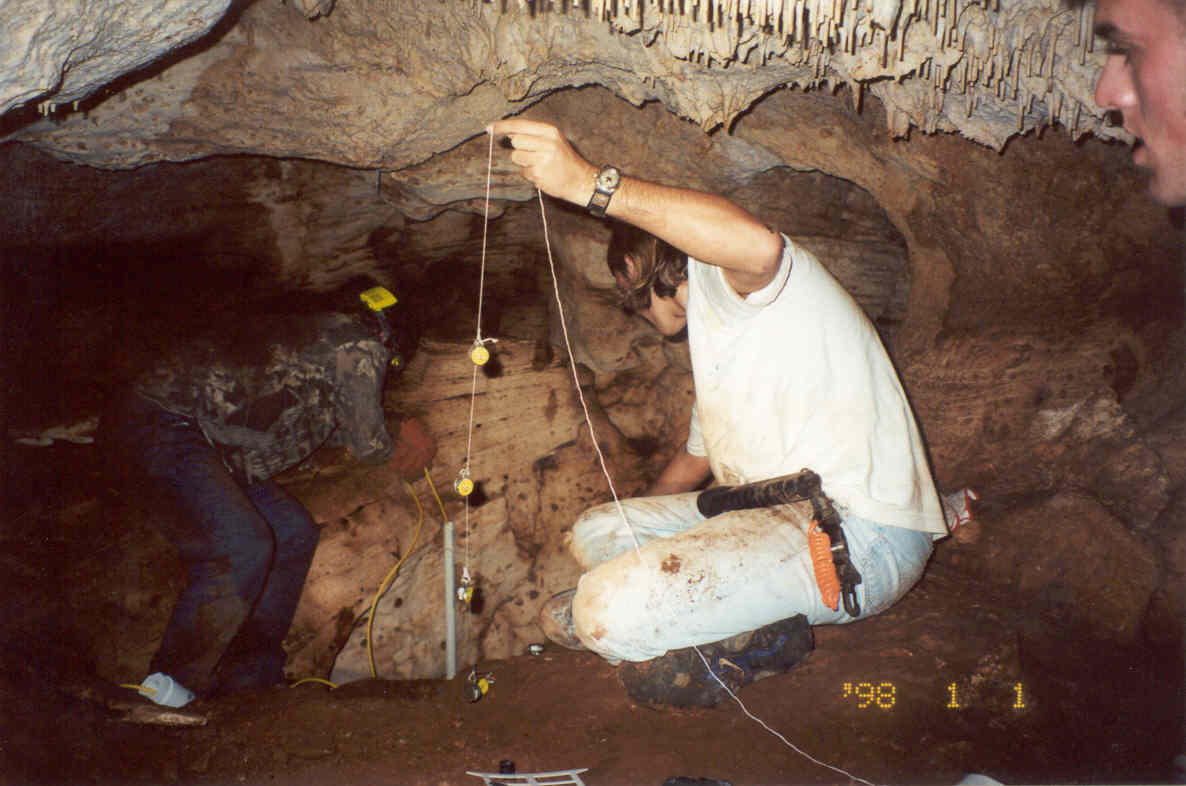
Caving research on San Salvador Island

- The Gerace Research Centre for the Study of Archaeology, Biology, Geology and Marine Science is located on the shores of Graham's Harbour on the north end of San Salvador Island. The centre (formerly The Bahamian Field Station) is used as a base camp for over 10,000 annual scientific researcher and student expeditions. The centre is currently run by Dr. Troy A. Dexter.
- The Bahamas Environmental Research Centre (BERC), located in central Andros, opened in 1995 as a collaborative effort with George Mason University in Virginia and the people of Andros. The BERC's primary objective is to promote an understanding of current ecological issues.
- The Marine and Environmental Studies Institute (MESI) is a multi-disciplinary research unit meeting national needs in scientific and technical research and community health. The institute was designed to build the nation's capacity for research, monitor marine and environmental resources and provide policy options for natural resource management. MESI partners with government ministries and international research institutions, provides leadership in program development in small island sustainability and provides year-round access to the unique sub-tropical ecosystems of the coastal, coral reefs, mangrove and sea grass communities in the Bahamas.
- As part of a Sustainable Science Initiative (SSI), the Poultry Research Unit carries out research and training on sustainable tropical island agriculture and supports collaboration with counterparts with similar research foci and funding. The first phase was completed in 2004 with funding from the Freedom Foundation. The initiative is located on a 6-acre (24,000 m^{2}) site southwest of the Oakes Field Campus at the Gladstone Road Agricultural Centre in New Providence.

== Library ==
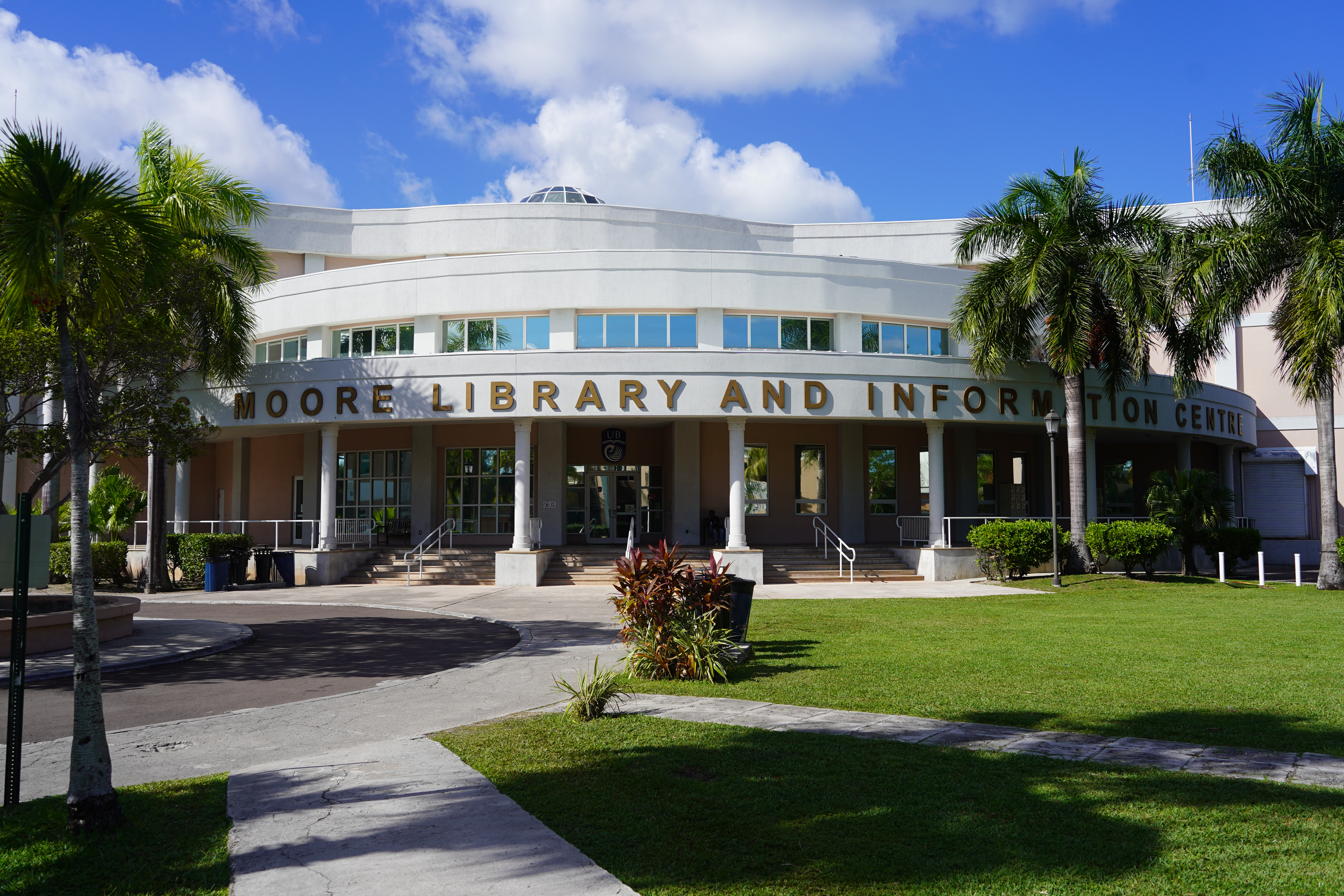
Harry C. Moore Library and Information Centre

Opened in 2011, the 60,000-square-foot (5,600 m^{2}) Harry C. Moore Library includes the law library, a 24-hour-a-day computer commons, auditorium, classrooms, media production studio, individual and group study spaces, institutional archives and exhibition spaces. The historical archives will serve as the de facto national library of the Bahamas, including the personal papers of Bahamian prime ministers. The library is named for American-born Bahamian philanthropist Harry C. Moore (1913-2003).

== Organization ==
The university is governed by the Council of the University of The Bahamas, chaired by Alfred Sears. The day-to-day operations are overseen by the president, who is appointed by the Council.

=== Senior administration ===
Key administrative personnel include:

- President, Dr. Robert J. Blaine III
- Provost/Vice President Academic Affairs, Dr. Maria Woodside-Oriakhi
- Executive Vice President, and President of the Northern Bahamas Campus, Dr. Ian Strachan
- Vice President for Operations, Mr. Ronnie Stevenson
- Vice President of Finance, Mr. Allington Hunter
- Vice President of Student Affairs, Mr. Joe Stubbs
- Vice President Institutional Advancement & Alumni Affairs, Mr. Dino Hernandez
- Vice President of Administrative Services, Dr. Marcella Elliott-Ferguson
- Vice President of Human Resources, Dr. Vochelle Ferguson

=== Presidents ===
The University of The Bahamas typically appoints presidents to three-year terms and has had eight presidents in fifteen years.

- Dr. Keva Bethel (1996–1998)
- Dr. Leon Higgs (1998–2004)
- Dr. Rhonda Chipman Johnson (2004)
- Dr. Rodney Smith (2004–2005)
- Dr. Rhonda Chipman Johnson (2005–2006)
- Ms. Janyne Hodder (2006–2010)
- Dr. Earla Carey-Baines (2010)
- Dr. Betsy Boze (2011–2013)
- Dr. Earla Carey-Baines (2014)
- Dr. Rodney D. Smith (2014–2022)
- Dr. Erik Rolland (2022–2023)
- Dr. Janyne Hodder (2023–2025)
- Dr. Robert Blaine III (2025–present)

=== Principals ===
- Dr. John Knowles (1974–1976)
- Dr. Kazim Bacchus (1976–1978)
- Dr. Jacob Bynoe (1979–1981)
- Dr. Keva Bethel (1982–1995)

== Controversy ==
Over the years, some of the members of the University of The Bahamas' Administration and Board of Trustees, which are in entrusted with the care of the management of university affairs, had a "chequered" past.

Former President, Rodney Smith, was fired from the same institution in 2005 for using "another academic's material without attribution" (plagiarism) during a student Convocation. This 2005 incident of Smith's was so shocking that the then-Chairman of the Council Franklyn Wilson said that it would be a "significant error for the country" if Smith was reappointed during an institutional presidential search in 2014.

One of the defenders of Smith's reappointment, former Bahamian Supreme Court Justice and current member of the Board of Trustees Ruby Nottage, claimed that the appointment process was transparent, open to public inquiry, and impartial. However, Ruby Nottage herself is not free from controversy. In 1986, she and her husband were indicted by a Boston grand jury of money laundering for a notorious Boston gangster.

== Academics ==
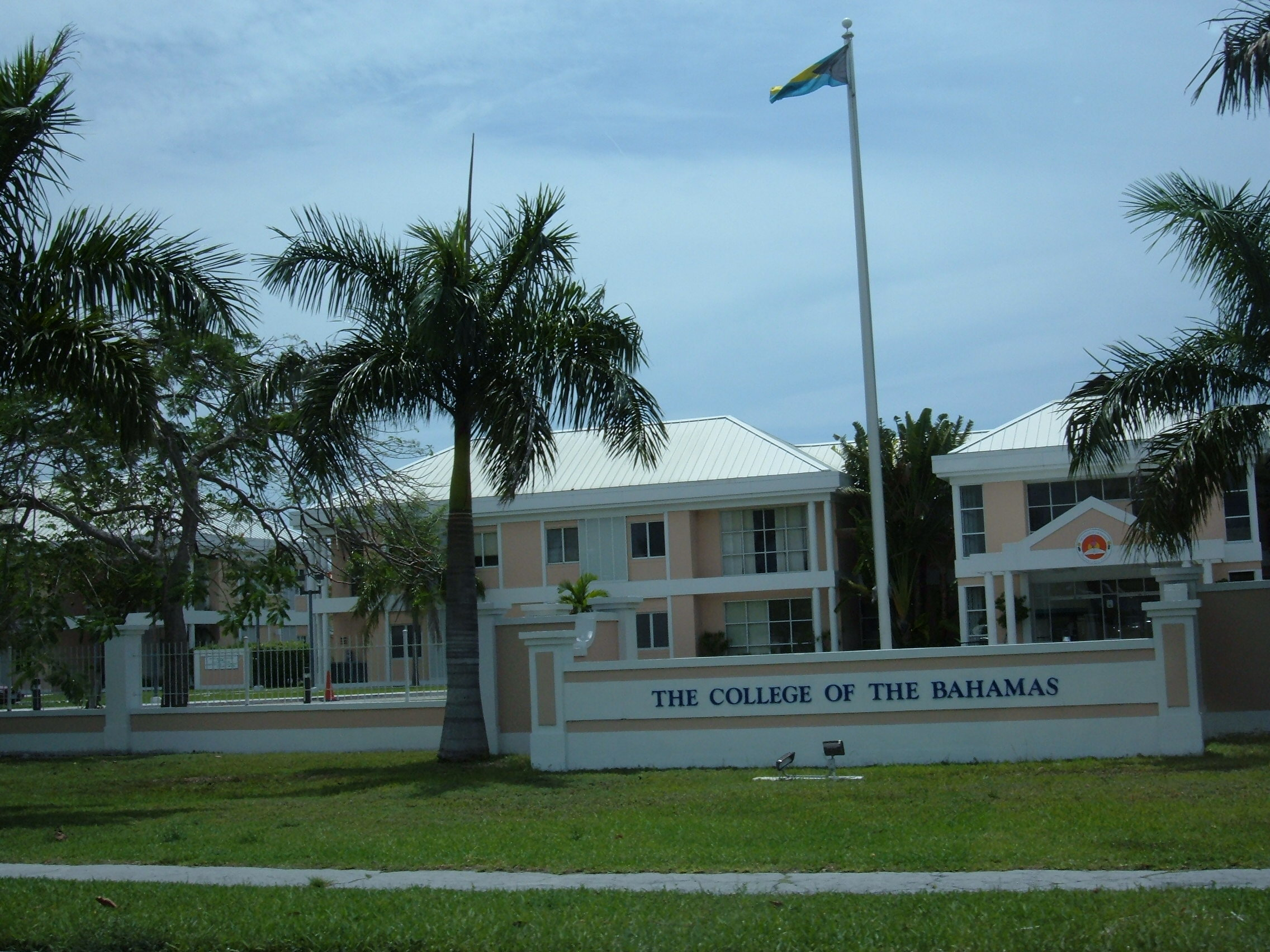
The Oakes Field Campus

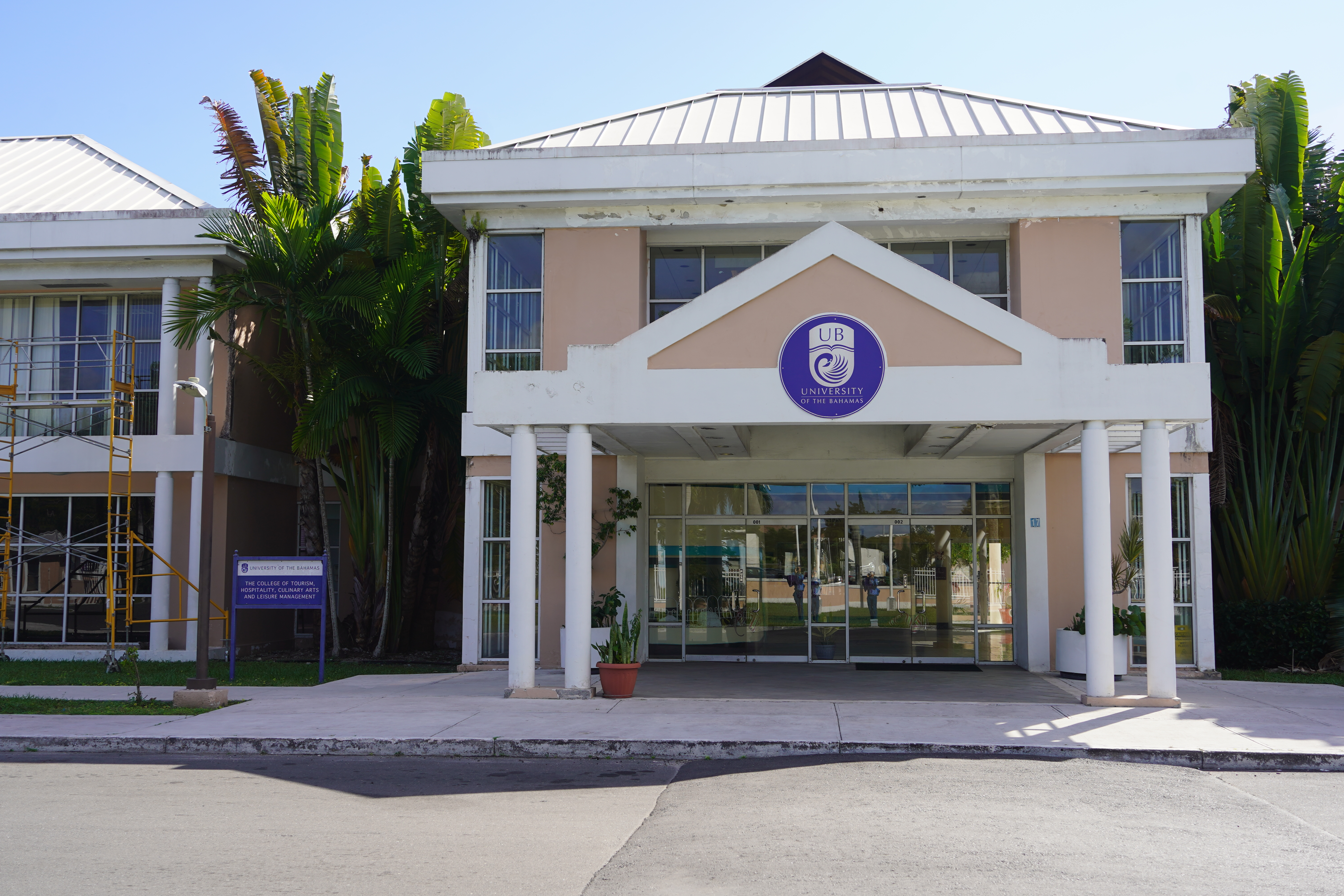
College of Tourism, Hospitality, Culinary Arts, and Leisure Management

The university offers certificates and diplomas as well as associate, baccalaureate and master's degrees for 66 majors and serves over 5,000 students. In 2011, 66 percent of the graduates earned baccalaureate degrees, reflecting the change in student demand and the emergence of institution from college to university. Over 80% of entering students enroll in baccalaureate and masters programs. Pharmacy, law, and other advanced professional degree programs are offered in partnership with Caribbean and American universities.

UB offers degrees through eight academic units, including an institute and seven schools. Six of the schools are organized into faculties (equivalent to colleges in Ameri universities) headed by an academic dean.

The Academic Faculties (equivalent to Colleges) and their related schools are:

- Faculty of Business
  - School of Business
- Faculty of Liberal and Fine Arts
  - School of Communication and Creative Arts
  - School of English Studies
- Faculty of Pure and Applied Sciences
  - School of Chemistry, Environmental and Life Sciences
  - School of Nursing and Allied Health
  - School of Mathematics, Physics and Technology
- Faculty of Social and Educational Studies
  - School of Education
  - School of Social Sciences
- International Languages and Cultures Institute
- Culinary and Hospitality Management Institute

== Athletics ==
The Mingoes, as the university's athletes are known, compete nationally and internationally.
