= 2027 in public domain =

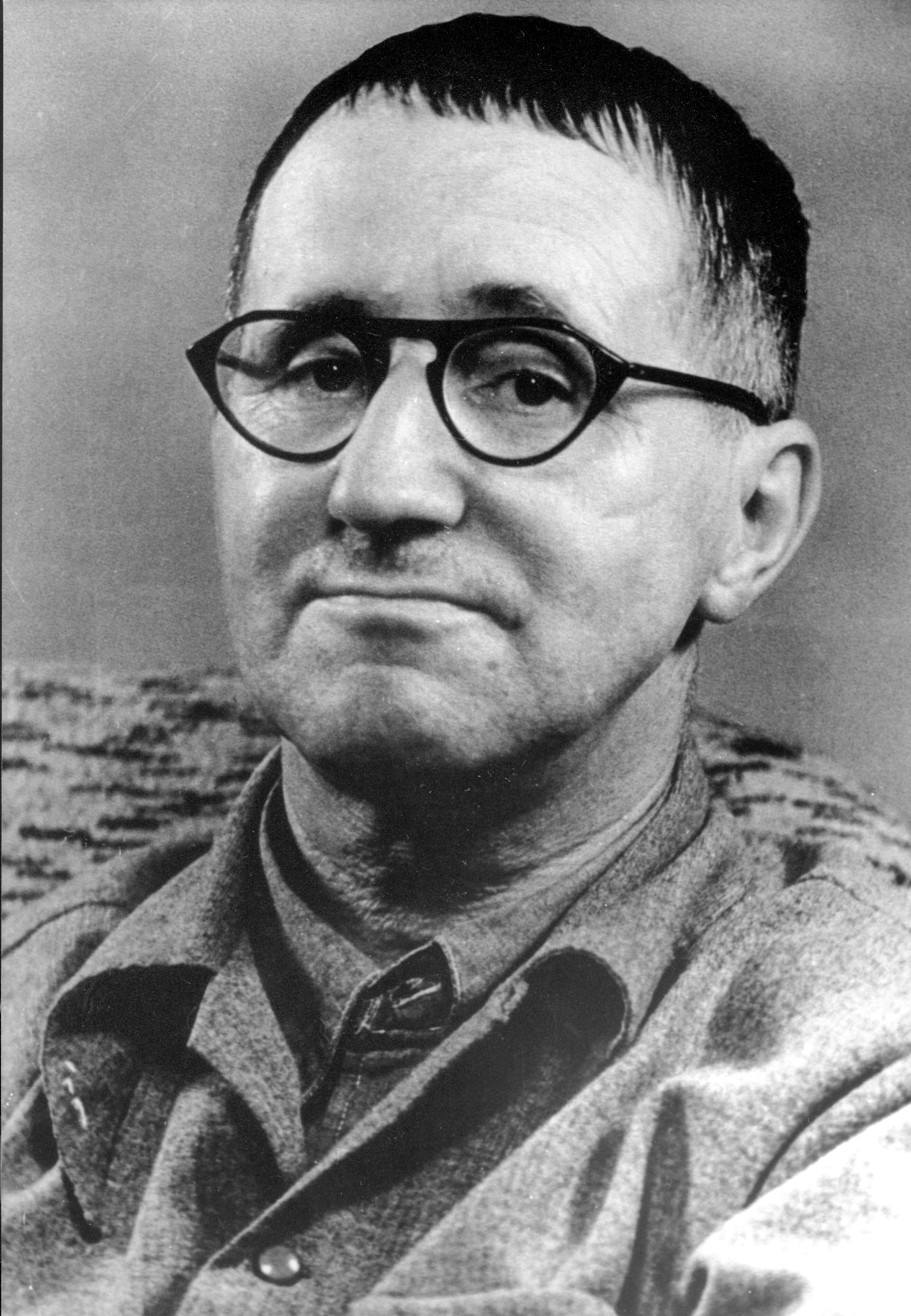
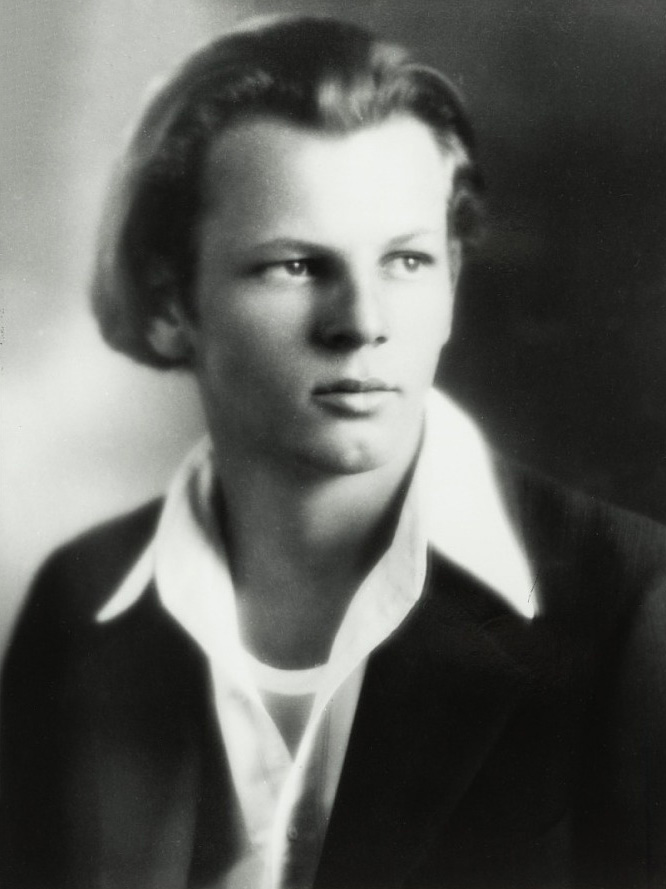
The novels and poems of Bertolt Brecht (left) and any play or screenplay he wrote alone or in collaboration with an author who preceded him in death (Note: Of his collaborators, Brecht was preceded in death by Margarete Steffin (in 1943), Karl Valentin (in 1948), and Kurt Weill (in 1950). Other collaborators of Brecht's outlived him.) will enter the public domain in Europe in 2027, along with the art of Jackson Pollock (right).

When a work's copyright expires, it enters the public domain. The following is a list of creators whose works enter the public domain in 2027. Since laws vary globally, the copyright status of some works are not uniform.

== Entering the public domain in countries with life + 70 years ==
With the exception of Belarus (Life + 50 years) and Spain (which has a copyright term of Life + 80 years for creators that died before 1987), a work enters the public domain in Europe 70 years after the creator's death, if it was published during the creator's lifetime. For previously unpublished material, those who publish it first will have the publication rights for 25 years. In addition several other countries in the world have a limit of 70 years. The list is sorted alphabetically and includes a notable work of the creator.

Names	Country	Death	Occupation	Notable work
Pietro Badoglio	Italy	1 November 1956	General	La guerra d'Etiopia, L'Italia nella seconda guerra mondiale
Julien Benda	France	7 June 1956	Writer	Bibliography
Émile Borel	France	3 February 1956	Mathematician	Les probabilités denombrables et leurs applications arithmétiques
Bertold Brecht	Germany	14 August 1956	Playwright	The Threepenny Opera, Life of Galileo, Mother Courage and Her Children, The Caucasian Chalk Circle, and other works
Pierre Brune	France	1 June 1956	Painter	
A. M. Burrage	United Kingdom	18 December 1956	Writer	
Ezio Camussi	Italy	11 August 1956	Composer	Compositions
Francisco de Aquino Correia	Brazil	22 March 1956	Writer	
Charles Fouqueray	France	28 March 1956	Painter	
Alexander Gretchaninov	Russia	3 January 1956	Composer	Selected works
Evelyn Beatrice Hall	United Kingdom	13 April 1956	Writer	The Friends of Voltaire
Mohammed Hussein Heikal	Egypt	8 December 1956	Novelist	Zeinab
Irène Joliot-Curie	France	17 March 1956	Chemist	
Aino Kallas	Finland, Estonia	9 November 1956	Writer	Sudenmorsian, The Pastor of Reigi, Barbara von Tisenhusen
Alexander Korda	Hungary, United Kingdom	23 January 1956	Director and screenwriter	Marius, The Private Life of Henry VIII
Paul Léautaud	France	22 February 1956	Writer	Works
Lee Jung-seob	South Korea	6 September 1956	Painter	Paintings
Guido Leto	Italy	1956	Politician	Publications
Évariste Lévi-Provençal	France	27 March 1956	Orientalist	Histoire de l'Espagne musulmane
Walter de la Mare	United Kingdom	22 June 1956	Writer	Memoirs of a Midget
Archibald Low	United Kingdom	13 September 1956	Writer and inventor	
A. A. Milne	United Kingdom	31 January 1956	Writer	Winnie-the-Pooh
Nicos Nicolaides	Cyprus	24 June 1956	Painter	Egyptian, 1917
Vladimir Obruchev	Russia	19 June 1956	Writer and geologist	Plutonia
Bob Olsen	United States	20 May 1956	Writer	
Giovanni Papini	Italy	8 July 1956	Writer	Publications
Fletcher Pratt	United States	10 June 1956	Writer	
John Rädecker	Netherlands	12 January 1956	Sculptor	National Monument (Amsterdam)
Alex Raymond	United States	6 September 1956	Writer	Flash Gordon
Vida Ravenscroft Sutton	United States	27 July 1956	Playwright	The Pilgrims' Holiday
Paul Renner	Germany	25 April 1956	Designer	Futura
Jackson Pollock	United States	11 August 1956	Painter	
Jacques Sadoul	France	18 November 1956	Politician	Works
Caroline Snedeker	United States	22 January 1956	Writer	Downright Dencey, The Forgotten Daughter
Jack Snow	United States	13 July 1956	Writer	The Magical Mimics in Oz, The Shaggy Man of Oz
Austin Osman Spare	United Kingdom	15 May 1956	Draughtsman, writer, painter	The Book of Pleasure, The Focus of Life
Gustav Suits	Estonia	23 May 1956	Poet	
Franz Tamayo	Bolivia	29 July 1956	Writer, politician	
F. Orlin Tremaine	United States	22 October 1956	Writer and editor	
Michael Ventris	United Kingdom	6 September 1956	Classics scholar, philologist	Documents in Mycenaean Greek, Introducing the Minoan Language
Amy Cripps Vernon	United Kingdom	2 August 1956	Writer	
Reşat Nuri Güntekin	Turkey	7 December 1956	writer, storywriter, and playwright	Çalıkuşu , Yeşil Gece , Yaprak Dökümü

== Countries with life + 60 years ==
In Bangladesh, India, and Venezuela a work enters the public domain 60 years after the creator's death.

Names	Country	Death	Occupation	Notable work
Ralph Allen	Canada	2 December 1966	Writer, journalist	Peace River Country
Lauro Ayestarán	Uruguay	22 July 1966	Musicologist	La música en el Uruguay
André Breton	France	28 September 1966	Writer, poet	Surrealist Manifesto
Jan Brzechwa	Poland	2 July 1966	Poet	
Deems Taylor	United States	3 July 1966	Composer, music critic	
Walt Disney	United States	15 December 1966	Filmmaker	
C. S. Forester	United Kingdom	2 April 1966	Writer	Horatio Hornblower, The African Queen, The General
Lloyd Garrett	United States	15 April 1966	Tenor, composer	
Alberto Giacometti	Switzerland	11 January 1966	Sculptor, painter	The Palace at 4 a.m., L'Homme au doigt, Grande tête mince, L'Homme qui marche I, Large Standing Woman I, Monumental Head
Erik Lindberg	Sweden	28 September 1966	Sculptor, engraver	Nobel Prize medal
César Batlle Pacheco	Uruguay	6 January 1966	Politician, Journalist	
Olhinto María Simoes	Uruguay	9 October 1966	Poet, journalist	La sombra de los plátanos
Cordwainer Smith	United States	6 August 1966	Science fiction writer, professor, military officer	Psychological Warfare, Norstrilia, Scanners Live in Vain, Alpha Ralpha Boulevard, A Planet Named Shayol
Evelyn Waugh	United Kingdom	10 April 1966	Writer	Vile Bodies, A Handful of Dust
Mohamed Fawzi	Egypt	20 October 1966	Singer, Musician	Kassaman
Mohamed El Qasabgi	Egypt	25 March 1966	Musician	Raq El Habib
Badie' Khayri	Egypt	1 February 1966	Playwright	Hassan wa Murqus wa Cohen
Sayyid Qutb	Egypt	29 August 1966	Writer	Ma'alim fi al-Tariq, Fi Zilal al-Quran

== Countries with life + 50 years ==
In most countries of Africa and Asia, as well as Belarus, Bolivia, New Zealand, and Egypt, a work enters the public domain 50 years after the creator's death.

Names	Country	Death	Occupation	Notable work
Zainul Abedin	Bangladesh	28 May 1976	Painter	Famine Sketches
Delia Bennett	United States	1976	Quilter	
Francis Oswald Bennett	New Zealand	4 August 1976	Author, doctor	March of the little men
Benjamin Britten	United Kingdom	4 December 1976	Composer	Compositions
Chen Hengzhe	China	7 January 1976	Author	One Day
Cheng Xiaoqing	China	12 October 1976	Author, translator	Works
Agatha Christie	United Kingdom	12 January 1976	Author	Agatha Christie bibliography
Stuart Cloete	South Africa	19 March 1976	Author	Turning Wheels
Kazuo Dan	Japan	2 January 1976	Author	House on Fire (novel)
Feng Xuefeng	China	31 January 1976	Author	
Percy Leo Fowler	New Zealand	3 November 1976	Author, broadcaster	Brown Conflict: A Tale of White Man and Maori, 1861-62
Funahashi Seiichi	Japan	13 January 1976	Author	Portrait of Madame Yuki (novel)
Daniel F. Galouye	United States	7 September 1976	SF Author	Dark Universe
Vince Guaraldi	United States	6 February 1976	Composer, musician	"Linus and Lucy"
Guo Xiaochuan	China	18 October 1976	Poet	
Han Sorya	North Korea	6 April 1976	Author	Jackals
Howard Hughes	United States	5 April 1976	Film director and producer	Hell's Angels
Fritz Lang	Austria; United States	2 August 1976	Film director, screenwriter, producer	Fritz Lang filmography
Munro Leaf	United States	21 December 1976	Author	The Story of Ferdinand
Valero Lecha	El Salvador	20 August 1976	Painter	Mercado al Aire Libre
Li Jinfa	China; United States	25 December 1976	Poet, sculptor	Poetry
Liao Chi-chun	Taiwan	13 February 1976	Painter	
Lin Yutang	Taiwan	26 March 1976	Author, translator	Works
Ma Ke	China	27 July 1976	Composer, musicologist	Music for Nanniwan
André Malraux	France	23 November 1976	Author	La Condition Humaine
Mao Zedong	China	9 September 1976	Politician	Quotations from Chairman Mao Tse-tung
Robert L. May	United States	11 August 1976	Retailer	Rudolph the Red-Nosed Reindeer
Gildardo Montoya	Colombia	25 November 1976	Musician, songwriter	"Plegaria Vallenata"
Ogiwara Seisensui	Japan	11 May 1976	Author, poet	
Edgar Pangborn	United States	1 February 1976	SF Author	A Mirror for Observers
Man Ray	United States	18 November 1976	Surrealist artist	
Crescencio Salcedo	Colombia	3 March 1976	Flautist, songwriter	"El Año Viejo", "La Múcura"
Mitsuko Shiga	Japan	23 March 1976	Poet	
Thomas Burnett Swann	United States	5 May 1976	SF Author, poet	The Minotaur Trilogy
Mohamed El-Tabii	Egypt	24 December 1976	Journalist	
Philip Taft	United States	17 November 1976	Labor historian	The Structure and Government of Labor Unions
Chōzaburō Tanaka	Japan	28 June 1976	Botanist, mycologist	
Max Tau	Germany; Norway	13 March 1976	Writer, editor	
Evert Taube	Sweden	31 January 1976	Songwriter, musician	"Calle Schewens vals"
Mary S. Taylor	United States	1976	Botanist	A Study of Nardia Lescurii
Phoebe Atwood Taylor	United States	9 January 1976	Writer	The Cape Cod Mystery
Minerva Teichert	United States	3 May 1976	Painter	The Madonna of 1847
Nazım Terzioğlu	Turkey	20 September 1976	Mathematician	
Albert Tessier	Canada	13 September 1976	Historian, film maker	
T. H. Tetens	Germany	February 1976	Journalist, writer	The New Germany and the Old Nazis
Giorgos Themelis	Greece	17 April 1976	Poet, essayist, playwright	Dentrokipos
Hans Thirring	Austria	22 March 1976	Physicist	
Cecil Thomas	United Kingdom	16 September 1976	Sculptor	Bromhead Memorial
Epaminondas Thomopoulos	Greece	4 January 1976	Painter	
John Thompson	Canada	26 April 1976	Poet	Stilt Jack
Ruth Plumly Thompson	United States	6 April 1976	Writer	The Royal Book of Oz
Adam Bruce Thomson	Scotland	4 December 1976	Painter	
Bertha Tideman-Wijers	Netherlands; Indonesia	1 January 1976	Composer	Small Suite for Carillon
Ivo Tijardović	Croatia	19 March 1976	Composer, writer, painter	Little Floramye
Mabel F. Timlin	Canada	19 September 1976	Economist	
Mark Tobey	United States	24 April 1976	Painter	
Barbara Euphan Todd	United Kingdom	2 February 1976	Writer	Worzel Gummidge
Guillermo Tolentino	Philippines	12 July 1976	Sculptor	Bonifacio Monument, UP Oblation
Sergey Tolstov	Russia	28 December 1976	Archaeologist, ethnographer	Old Khwarezm
Elihan Tore	East Turkestan Republic	28 February 1976	Politician	Türkistan kaygısı
Torii Kotondo	Japan	13 July 1976	Painter, woodblock printer	
Ralph Townsend	United States	25 January 1976	Writer, consul	Ways That Are Dark
Willie Trice	United States	11 December 1976	Songwriter, musician	
Juan Manuel Trujillo	Spain	1976	Essayist	
Dalton Trumbo	United States	10 September 1976	Screenwriter	Spartacus screenplay
Pál Turán	Hungary	26 September 1976	Mathematician	
Grace Turnbull	United States	26 December 1976	Painter, sculptor, writer	Python of India (sculpture)
George Tzavellas	Greece	18 October 1976	Screenwriter, director	The Counterfeit Coin
Stephen Ullmann	Hungary	10 January 1976	Linguist	The Principles of Semantics
Antoni Uniechowski	Poland	28 May 1976	Illustrator	
Annie Ure	United Kingdom	13 July 1976	Archeologist	Works
Francisco Urondo	Argentina	17 June 1976	Author	Works
Peter Ury	United Kingdom; Germany	20 September 1976	Composer, playwright, journalist	Works
Alison Uttley	United Kingdom	7 May 1976	Author	Works
Valentin Vaala	Finland	21 November 1976	Director, screenwriter	Ihmiset suviyössä
Tamara Vakhvakhishvili	Soviet Union	31 October 1976	Composer	Works
Diego Valeri	Italy	28 November 1976	Poet, critic	
Mall Valk	Estonia	12 October 1976	Ceramist	Works
Adam Vetulani	Poland	25 September 1976	Historian	Works
Vi Huyền Đắc	Vietnam	16 August 1976	Playwright	
Renata Viganò	Italy	23 April 1976	Writer	L'Agnese va a morire
William G. Vinal	United States	9 July 1976	Naturalist, educator	
Nikolai Virta	Soviet Union	3 January 1976	Writer	Odinochestvo
Luchino Visconti	Italy	17 March 1976	Director, screenwriter	The Leopard
Mark Vishniak	Russian Empire; United States	31 August 1976	Writer	Years of Emigration, 1919–1969
André-Léon Vivrel	France	7 April 1976	Painter, illustrator	
Kathe Volkart-Schlager	Austria	1976	Composer	
Vladimir Vranić	Croatia	3 August 1976	Mathematician	Vjerojatnost i statistika
Clara Coltman Vyvyan	Australia	1 March 1976	Travel writer	On Timeless Shores: Journeys in Ireland
Ernest Wallcousins	United Kingdom	January 1976	Illustrator, painter	Illustrations for Myths and Legends of Babylonia and Assyria
Martha Walter	United States	January 1976	Impressionist painter	Motherhood
Oliver Warner	United Kingdom	14 August 1976	Naval historian, writer	Works
Ned Washington	United States	20 December 1976	Lyricist	Lyrics to "When You Wish Upon a Star"
Mark Hanna Watkins	United States	24 February 1976	Linguist, anthropologist	A Grammar of Chichewa
Paul Weatherwax	United States	18 October 1976	Botanist, botanical illustrator	Works
David L. Webster	United States	17 December 1976	Physicist	Works
Isabelle Clark Percy West	United States	25 August 1976	Painter, printmaker, designer	
Judith Westphalen	Peru	31 December 1976	Painter	
Harvey Samuel Whistler	United States	17 March 1976	Violinist, composer	"Introducing the Positions for Violin"
Marjorie Whitaker	United Kingdom	7 January 1976	Author	Works
Minor White	United States	24 June 1976	Photographer	
Martin Wickramasinghe	Sri Lanka	23 July 1976	Author	Gamperaliya
Dorothy Wilding	United Kingdom	9 February 1976	Photographer	Portrait of Lady Angela Forbes
Clifton Williams	United States	12 February 1976	Composer	Works
Clara McDonald Williamson	United States	17 February 1976	Painter	Git 'Long Little Dogies
Cherry Wilson	United States	November 1976	Novelist	Thunder Breaks
Fritz Winter	Germany	1 October 1976	Painter	Earthbound
Józef Wittlin	United States	28 February 1976	Novelist, poet, translator	Salt of the Earth
Marcel Wolfers	Belgium	1976	Sculptor, medallist	Monument aux morts de la guerre, Louvain
Wilfrid Wood	United Kingdom	18 February 1976	Engraver, watercolourist	By Underground to Kew
James Woodford	United Kingdom	8 November 1976	Sculptor	Robin hood statue outside Nottingham Castle
Ellamarie Woolley	United States	1976	Enamel artist, muralist	Women with Birds
Marjorie Muir Worthington	United States	17 February 1976	Writer	
Arthur Wragg	United Kingdom	17 August 1976	Illustrator	Illustrations for The Psalms for Modern Life
Arthur F. Wright	United States	11 August 1976	Historian	The Sui Dynasty
Horace Kenton Wright	Bahamas	14 November 1976	Artist	
Margaret Wrightson	United Kingdom	1976	Sculptor	Works
Wu Chuo-liu	Taiwan	7 October 1976	Author	Orphan of Asia
Satyu Yamaguti	Japan	11 March 1976	Parasitologist	Synopsis of digenetic trematodes of vertebrates
Akio Yashiro	Japan	9 April 1976	Composer	Piano Concerto (Yashiro)
Yashpal	India	26 December 1976	Writer	Jhutha Sach
Yirawala	Australia	17 April 1976	Artist	
Mihal Zallari	Albania	17 March 1976	Historian, journalist, poet	
Joaquín Zamacois	Chile	8 September 1976	Composer, author	
Zheng Lücheng	China	7 December 1976	Composer	Music for the Military Anthem of the People's Liberation Army
Zhou Enlai	China	8 January 1976	Politician	
Zhu De	China	6 July 1976	Politician	
Anna Zinkeisen	United Kingdom	23 September 1976	Artist	Portrait of Archibald McIndoe
Khayr al-Dīn al-Ziriklī	Syria	25 November 1976	Poet, biographer	al-Aʻlām
Adolph Zukor	United States	10 June 1976	Filmmaker	
Jacek Żuławski	Poland	27 November 1976	Sculptor	
Alberto Zum Felde	Uruguay	6 May 1976	Historian, essayist	

== Countries with life + 80 years ==
Spain has a copyright term of life + 80 years for creators that died before 1987. In Colombia and Equatorial Guinea, a work enters the public domain 80 years after the creator's death.

Names	Country	Death	Occupation	Notable work
Giuseppe Adami	Italy	12 October 1946	librettist	Libretti for three operas composed by Giacomo Puccini
Eriks Ādamsons	Latvia	28 February 1946	writer, poet, translator	
Armando Augusto Freire (Armandinho)	Portugal	21 December 1946	Fado guitarist and composer	
Louis Bachelier	France	28 April 1946	Mathematician	
Herbert Baker	United Kingdom	4 February 1946	Architect	
Helen Bannerman	United Kingdom	3 October 1946	Writer	The Story of Little Black Sambo
Granville Bantock	United Kingdom	16 October 1946	composer	
James Bernard	United Kingdom	5 March 1946	Elocutionist	
Allan Cyril Brooks	Canada	3 January 1946	Ornithologist, illustrator and artist	
Alfonso Broqua	Uruguay	24 November 1946	Composer	
Charles Despiau	France	30 October 1946	Sculptor	
J. Michael Diack	United Kingdom	2 February 1946	Composer, arranger	Arranged nursery rhymes in the style of Handel
Manuel de Falla	Spain	14 November 1946	Composer	Nights in the Gardens of Spain, Ritual Fire Dance
W. C. Fields	United States	25 December 1946	Writer	
Jane Findlater	United Kingdom	20 May 1946	Writer	
Dion Fortune	United Kingdom	6 January 1946	Writer and occultist	The Demon Lover, The Winged Bull, The Goat-Foot God, The Sea Priestess
Wanda Gág	United States	27 June 1946	Children's book author, artist, translator and illustrator	Millions of Cats
Gerhart Hauptmann	Germany	6 June 1946	Writer, Nobel Prize laureate	The Weavers, Bahnwärter Thiel (De)
Patty Hill	United States	25 May 1946	Songwriter	Happy Birthday to You (with sister Mildred J. Hill, who predeceased her)
Violet Jacob	United Kingdom	9 September 1946	Writer and poet	
John Maynard Keynes	United Kingdom	21 April 1946	Economist	A Treatise on Money
Hermann von Keyserling	Germany	26 April 1946	Philosopher	
Otis Adelbert Kline	United States	24 October 1946	Literary agent and science fiction writer	
Paul Langevin	France	19 December 1946	Physicist	
Henri Le Fauconnier	France	1946	Painter	
Józef Mehoffer	Poland	8 July 1946	Painter and decorative artist	
Adolph de Meyer	France	6 January 1946	Photographer	
László Moholy-Nagy	Hungary	24 November 1946	Painter and photographer	Light-Space Modulator
Paul Nash	United Kingdom	11 July 1946	Painter/photographer	
Mikhail Nesterov	Russia	18 October 1942	Painter	
Feliks Nowowiejski	Poland	18 January 1946	Composer	Rota (music)
Clemente Palma	Peru	13 August 1946	Author	
Júlio Prestes	Brazil	9 February 1946	Politician	
Damon Runyon	United States	10 December 1946	Writer and newspaperman	
Abel Salazar	Portugal	29 December 1946	Scientist and Painter	
Alice Sauvrezis	France	12 April 1946	Composer	
Ernest Thompson Seton	United Kingdom	23 October 1946	Writer and wildlife artist	Wild Animals I Have Known
May Sinclair	United Kingdom	14 November 1946	Writer	
Václav Špála	Czech Republic	13 May 1946	Painter	
Léon Spilliaert	Belgium	23 November 1946	Painter	
Gertrude Stein	United States	27 July 1946	Writer	The Autobiography of Alice B. Toklas, Three Lives
Karl Hans Strobl	Czech Republic	10 March 1946	Author and editor	
Harry Von Tilzer	United States	10 January 1946	Songwriter	Ziegfeld Follies
Frona Eunice Wait	United States	1946	Author and newspaper writer	Wines and Vines of California
George Henry Weiss	United States	1946	Writer of science fiction and poetry	The Night People
H. G. Wells	United Kingdom	13 August 1946	Writer	The Time Machine, The War of the Worlds, The Invisible Man
Stewart Edward White	United States	18 September 1946	Writer and spiritualist	
Alfred Rosenberg	Germany	16 October 1946	Politician, writer	The Myth of the Twentieth Century
Paul Zech	Germany	7 September 1946	Poet	Die lasterhaften Balladen und Lieder des François Villon
Heinrich Freiherr von Stackelberg	Germany	12 October 1946	Economist	Marktform und Gleichgewicht

== United States ==
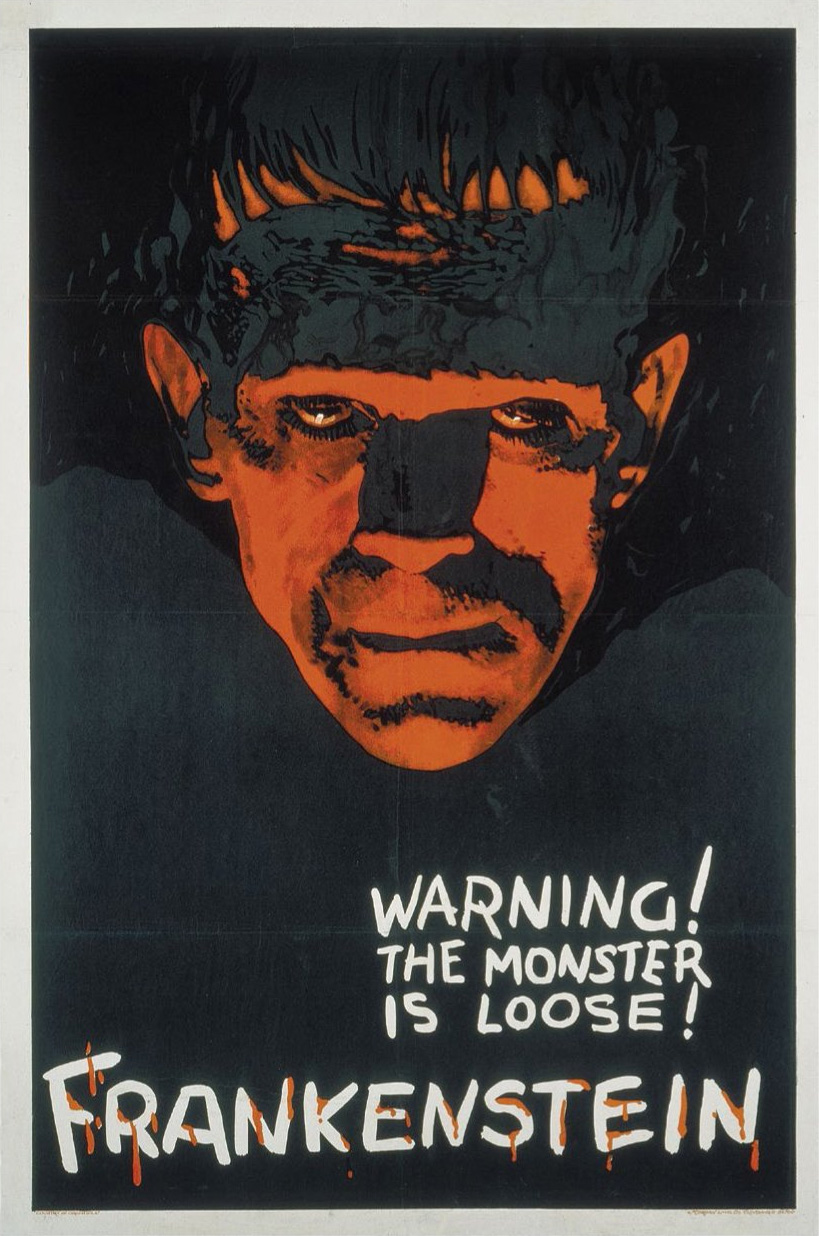
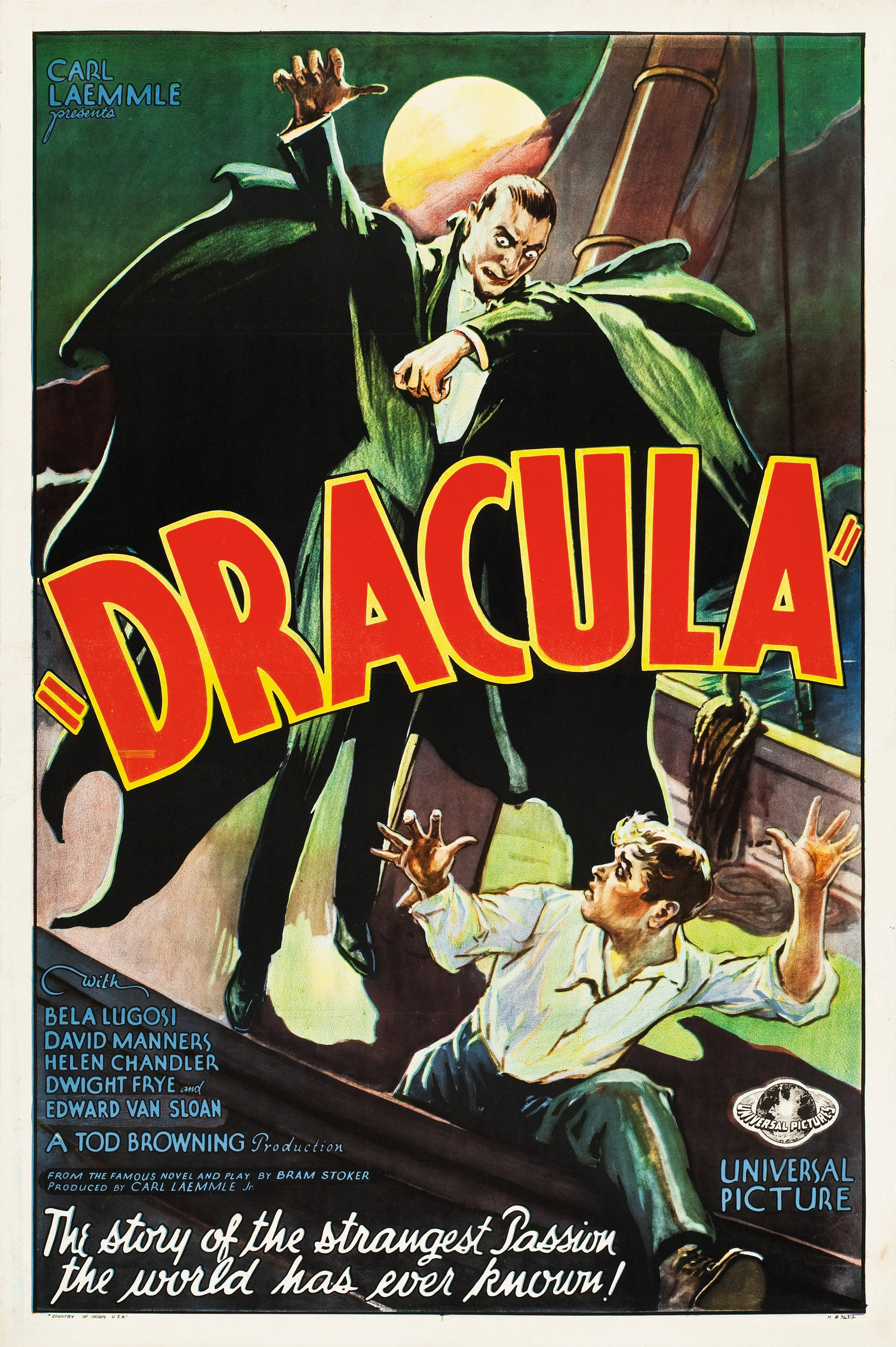
Notable works entering the public domain in the United States in 2027 include two of the most famous Universal Monsters films, Frankenstein and Dracula.

Under the Copyright Term Extension Act, books published in 1931, films released in 1931, and other works published in 1931 will enter the public domain in 2027. Sound recordings that were published in 1926 and unpublished works whose authors died in 1956 will also enter the public domain.

The most famous works entering the public domain this year are Disney's animated short The Moose Hunt, which featured Pluto in his first appearance under his familiar name and as Mickey Mouse's dog; and Universal Pictures' adaptations of Frankenstein and Dracula, starring Boris Karloff and Bela Lugosi in their respective lead roles. The 1931 installments of E. C. Segar's comic strip Thimble Theatre, including those that introduced early depictions of J. Wellington Wimpy and Popeye's use of spinach to gain his superpowers, as well as the character Dick Tracy created by Chester Gould, were both already in the public domain due to lack of proper copyright renewal. The same applied to the first Merrie Melodies cartoons and the character Foxy, who starred in three of them.

Other significant films entering the public domain include Charlie Chaplin's City Lights, the gangster film The Public Enemy starring James Cagney and Jean Harlow, the Marx Brothers film Monkey Business, Laurel and Hardy's first feature film Pardon Us, Fritz Lang's serial killer drama M starring Peter Lorre, the first sound adaptation of Alice in Wonderland, Rouben Mamoulian's Dr. Jekyll and Mr. Hyde starring Fredric March (which won him the year's Academy Award for Best Actor, the first Oscar awarded to a horror film), Lloyd Corrigan's Daughter of the Dragon starring Anna May Wong, Frank Borzage's Best Director Academy Award-winning film Bad Girl, Safe in Hell starring Dorothy Mackaill and Donald Cook, Possessed starring Joan Crawford and Clark Gable, King Vidor's The Champ starring Wallace Beery, Josef von Sternberg's Dishonored starring Marlene Dietrich, Alexander Korda's Marius along with the Swedish-language version titled Longing for the Sea, Michael Powell's directorial debut Two Crowded Hours, Otto Preminger's directorial debut The Great Love, F. W. Murnau's final film Tabu: A Story of the South Seas, the John Ford films Arrowsmith and The Brat, the Alfred Hitchcock films The Skin Game, Mary and Rich and Strange, Frank Capra's films Dirigible, The Miracle Woman and Platinum Blonde, Palmy Days with Eddie Cantor, A Connecticut Yankee with Will Rogers, Mädchen in Uniform (one of the earliest films depicting a lesbian relationship), G. W. Pabst's The Threepenny Opera, another film version of Dracula in the Spanish language starring Carlos Villarías, Mário Peixoto's Limite, Dave Fleischer's animated cartoon Bimbo's Initiation, the rest of Mickey's cartoons released in 1931 as well as the third year of shorts in the Silly Symphony series, the first cartoons of Charles Mintz's character Scrappy, the first Canadian sound film The Viking, the first Soviet sound film Road to Life, the first Bollywood musical Alam Ara (now believed lost), and the first film adaptation of The Maltese Falcon.

Important literary works entering the public domain include Pearl S. Buck's The Good Earth, William Faulkner's novel Sanctuary, Virginia Woolf's novel The Waves, Lynn Riggs' play Green Grow the Lilacs, The Pocket Book of Boners with the earliest illustration work by Dr. Seuss, Erich Maria Remarque's novel The Road Back, James Hanley's novel Boy, J. Slauerhoff's novel The Forbidden Kingdom, The Four Immigrants Manga by Henry (Yoshitaka) Kiyama in it's original Japanese, the final volume of Winston Churchill's The World Crisis, the detective stories The Sittaford Mystery by Agatha Christie and The Glass Key by Dashiell Hammett, Walter B. Gibson's pulp novel The Living Shadow introducing The Shadow (whose prior non-visual appearance in the radio show Detective Story Hour was already in the public domain), alternate history anthology If It Had Happened Otherwise along with its American revised version titled If: or, History Rewritten, the tenth Hardy Boys mystery What Happened at Midnight, the Nancy Drew Mystery Stories The Secret at Shadow Ranch (introducing major supporting character George Fayne) and The Secret of Red Gate Farm, Georges Simenon's novel The Strange Case of Peter the Lett (containing the first introduction of Inspector Jules Maigret) in its original French, Ferdinand Bordewijk's dystopian sciencefiction novel Blokken, the full album version of Hergé's Tintin in the Congo (the character's second and arguably most controversial story) and the first serialized pages of Tintin in America in their original French black-and-white versions, and Jean de Brunhoff's The Story of Babar in its original French. Disney's first hardcover book The Adventures of Mickey Mouse, which introduced a prototypical character who three years later became Donald Duck, will also enter the public domain in 2027.

The first installments of Suihō Tagawa's Norakuro, one of the earliest Shōnen manga series, which started the first children's manga boom in the 1930s and was one of the only pre-war manga series to survive the conquest of Imperial Japan; and the Chinese-Indonesian comic strip Put On by Kho Wan Gie, the first widely recognized comic in Indonesia; will become public domain in the United States in 2027 in their original Japanese and Malay respectively.

Among the better-known songs entering the public domain are "As Time Goes By", "Minnie the Moocher", "Which Side Are You On?", "All of Me", and "Brother, Can You Spare a Dime?", John Philip Sousa's march "Kansas Wildcats", and Billy Murray's song "Popeye the Sailor Man", written as a promotional asset for Thimble Theatre.

Artworks entering the public domain include Salvador Dalí's painting The Persistence of Memory, Paul Landowski's sculpture Christ the Redeemer, Pablo Picasso's sculpture Bust of a Woman (Marie-Thérèse), M. C. Escher's early print Atrani, Coast of Amalfi, and August Sander's photobook Face of Our Time, containing Berlin Coal Carrier and other photographs that Sander created in 1929.

== See also ==
- List of American films of 1931
- 1931 in literature
- 1931 in music
- 1956 in literature and 1976 in literature for deaths of writers
- Public Domain Day
- Creative Commons
- 2028 in public domain
