= Mladen Vranic =

Canadian medical researcher

Mladen Vranić
- Born: 3 April 1930; Zagreb, Croatia
- Died: 18 June 2019 (aged 89)
- Education: University of Zagreb

Mladen Vranic, MD, DSc, O.C., O.Ont, FRSC, FRCP(C), FCAHS, Canadian Medical Hall of Fame[CMHF] April 3, 1930 – June 18, 2019, was a Croatian-born diabetes researcher, best known for his work in tracer methodology, exercise and stress in diabetes, the metabolic effects of hormonal interactions, glucagon physiology, extrapancreatic glucagon, the role of the direct and indirect metabolic effects of insulin and the prevention of hypoglycemia. Vranic was recognized by a number of national and international awards for his research contributions, mentoring and administration including the Orders of Canada (Officer) and Ontario.

== Personal life and education ==
Mladen Vranic (Croatian: Vranić) was born in 1930 to Vladimir Vranić and Ana Vranić in Zagreb, Croatia. His Jewish father converted to Christianity in 1920, and his mother converted upon marriage, but they were both non-observant. His father was a professor at the Faculty of Economics, Engineering, and Sciences, and Dean at the School of Economics and Engineering at the University of Zagreb. His mother ran a beauty salon in Zagreb.

Vranic's immediate family escaped from the Holocaust due to the Italians' humane treatment of Jews. After the collapse of Italy, his family escaped with a partisan boat to Vis, an island governed by Allied Forces and Croatian partisans, and then on a British military ship to Taranto, Italy, which was already under supervision by the Allied Forces. During the last year of the war, his father joined the partisans.

After the war, his family returned to Zagreb where Vranic completed high school, and medical school (1955) and received a D.Sc. in physiology at the University of Zagreb in 1962. Vranic was invited to be the last post-doctoral fellow of Charles Best, a co-discoverer of insulin. He was promoted to assistant professor in 1965, associate professor in 1968 and full professor in 1972 at the University of Toronto Department of Physiology. Vranic was chair of the Department of Physiology from 1991 to 1995. In 1978 he was cross-appointed to professor in the Faculty of Medicine. In 1976-1977 he was an invited professor at the University of Geneva during a sabbatical leave and a visiting research fellow of Merton College at the University of Oxford. From 1973 to 1978 he was appointed a member of the Institute of Biomedical Electronics and Engineering at the University of Toronto.

He was an adjunct professor at the Karolinska Institute, Stockholm and at the University of Zagreb, Croatia. Vranic is also a member of the division of endocrinology and metabolism at the department of medicine and a fellow at the Senior Scholar's College at the University of Toronto.

His first wife, Magda Vranic, was an assistant professor in rehabilitation medicine at the University of Toronto. She died of breast cancer at the age of 50. Together, they had two daughters (Iva and Maja (deceased). He married Linda Margaret Swallow in 1983. Together they had two daughters (Claire and Anne).

Vranic died on June 18, 2019, in Toronto, Canada, of congestive heart failure.

== Research ==
Vranic's research accomplishments reflect the supervision of a large number of graduate students and post-doctoral fellows, and wide collaboration with basic and clinical researchers who were crucial for interaction between basic science, molecular and cell biology, and clinical research. He has 214 peer-reviewed publications and is recognized for his research contributions in the following areas:

=== Tracer methodology ===
The treatment of diabetes concentrates on the liver and/or the periphery. Vranic quantified hormonal and metabolic interactions involved in the physiology and pathogenesis of diabetes by developing tracer methods to separate the effects of diabetes on both. A large amount of his research accomplishments are due to measurement of non-steady state glucose kinetics. He collaborated in the first clinical tracer studies on insulin resistance, hypertriglyceridemia, and the Cori cycle.

=== Extrapancreatic glucagon ===
Diabetes reflects insulin deficiency and glucagon abundance. Vranic discovered extrapancreatic glucagon in dogs, which changed the prevailing dogma and permitted precise exploration of the roles of insulin and glucagon in physiology and diabetes, and provided conclusive evidence about the role of glucagon in diabetes. Before his research, glucagon was considered to have effects on many organs, but he was the first to measure the physiological role of glucagon, based on the effect of glucagon on glucose turnover. In contrast to prevailing beliefs, he was the first to indicate that glucagon only acts on the liver. He was also the first to quantify the physiological secretion of insulin.

=== Glucose metabolism ===
Vranic was the first to establish the critical role of glucagon-insulin interaction and the control of glucose metabolism during moderate exercise and of catecholamines during strenuous exercise. He quantified the deficiencies in the release and effects of these hormones in diabetes. He also revealed how acute and chronic hyperglycemia affects the expression of GLUT2 gene and protein in diabetes.

=== Exercise and stress ===
Vranic pioneered new concepts of the role of exercise in diabetes, leading to precise methods of controlling insulin, allowing type 1 diabetics to participate in the Olympics and clinicians to recommend exercise and healthy eating habits to prevent type 2 diabetes. He outlined molecular and physiological mechanisms whereby exercise training and adaptation to repetitive neurogenic stress can prevent diabetes in Zucker Diabetic Fatty (ZDF) rats.

=== Indirect effect of insulin ===
Vranic and others established that the indirect effect of insulin plays an important role in the regulation of glucose production in dogs. They confirmed this effect in humans and its role in type 2 diabetes.

=== Mechanisms whereby the liver and muscle are protected against hypoglycemia ===
Vranic showed that because the muscle and the liver are protected against changes in glucose levels, these organs do not have diabetic complications.

=== Prevention of hypoglycemia ===
Vranic described the molecular mechanisms responsible for increased HPA axis in diabetes and for the diminished responses of HPA axis, catecholamines and glucagon to hypoglycemia. He proposed a new approach to decrease the threat of hypoglycemia by blocking the effect of somatostatin. Vranic's research accomplishments and his main collaborators are summarized in a career retrospective entitled: "Odyssey between Scylla and Charybdis through storms of carbohydrate metabolism and diabetes: a career retrospective. Am J Physiol Endocrinol Metab 299: E849–E867, 2010".

== Honours and awards ==
The Symposium to Honour Mladen Vranic for a Lifetime of Scientific Achievements and Mentoring, Toronto, Ontario, Canada (2010); he is a Laureate of the Canadian Medical Hall of Fame (2009); the Canadian Diabetes Association Inaugural Life-Time Achievement Award for leadership in diabetes research and contribution to the Canadian diabetes community (2007); the honorary keynote speaker on Endocrinology and Diabetes; he is a member of The Society of Chinese Bioscientists of North America (2006); the Albert Renold Award from the American Diabetes Association for a distinguished career in the training of diabetes research scientists and facilitation of research (the only Canadian to receive this award) (2005); he is a Poll Visiting Scholar, University of Washington, Seattle, Washington (1995); the Novo Nordisk Lecture, Karolinska Institute, Stockholm (1995); the Solomon A. Berson Distinguished Lectureship of American Physiological Society - Endocrinology and Metabolism Section, FASEB, Atlanta (the first Canadian to receive this award) (1995); recognition for outstanding contributions to the Juvenile Diabetes Foundation, Canada (1994); the Mizuno Inaugural Lectureship and Award, Fourth International Symposium on Exercise and Diabetes - Osaka University, Japan (1992); the Banting Medal and Lectureship for Distinguished Scientific Achievement (American Diabetes Association) (1991); the R. Kroc Lectureship, University of Southern California School of Medicine, Los Angeles (1991); the Peter J. Laurie Memorial Lecture of Juvenile Diabetes Foundation Canada, Toronto (1991); the JDFI Mary Kugel Award (1989); the Inaugural Banting and Best Memorial Lecture and the Canadian Diabetes Association Award (1985); he is a Canada Council Killam Scholar (1988, 1989).
