= Leland S. McClung =

American bacteriologist

- Born: August 4, 1910; Atlanta, Texas
- Died: May 9, 2000 (aged 89); Bloomington, Indiana
- Awards: Guggenheim Fellowship (1939)

Leland Swint McClung (1910–2000) was an American bacteriologist with an international reputation for his research on anaerobic bacteria.

McClung graduated from the University of Texas with a B.A. in 1931 and from the University of Wisconsin with an M.A. in 1932 and a Ph.D. in 1934. From 1936 to 1937 he was an instructor in bacteriology and a junior bacteriologist at the Experiment Station, University of California. From 1937 to 1940 he was an instructor in research medicine at the George Williams Hooper Foundation for Medical Research, University of California. At Indiana University he was a full professor and the head of the department of bacteriology from 1940 to 1965, when he retired as professor emeritus. In 1943 he recruited Salvador Luria for the department.

== Selected publications ==
- McClung, L. S. (1935). "Studies on Anaerobic Bacteria: IV. Taxonomy of Cultures of a Thermophilic Species Causing "Swells" of Canned Foods". Journal of Bacteriology. 29 (2): 189–203. doi:10.1128/JB.29.2.189-203.1935. PMC 545155. PMID 16559777.
- Davis, W. A.; McClung, L. S. (1940). "Aspergillosis in Wild Herring Gulls". Journal of Bacteriology. 40 (2): 321–323. doi:10.1128/JB.40.2.321-323.1940. PMC 374637. PMID 16560349.
- Mrak, E. M.; McClung, L. S. (1940). "Yeasts Occurring on Grapes and in Grape Products in California". Journal of Bacteriology. 40 (3): 395–407. doi:10.1128/JB.40.3.395-407.1940. PMC 374645. PMID 16560356.
- Sanders, D. W.; Weatherwax, P.; McClung, L. S. (1945). "Antibacterial Substances from Plants Collected in Indiana". Journal of Bacteriology. 49 (6): 611–615. doi:10.1128/JB.49.6.611-615.1945. PMC 374094. PMID 16560960.
- McClung, L. S. (1945). "Human Food Poisoning Due to Growth of Clostridium perfringens (C. Welchii) in Freshly Cooked Chicken: Preliminary Note". Journal of Bacteriology. 50 (2): 229–231. doi:10.1128/JB.50.2.229-231.1945. PMC 374130. PMID 16560992.
- McClung, L. S.; Toabe, R. (1947). "The Egg Yolk Plate Reaction for the Presumptive Diagnosis of Clostridium sporogenes and Certain Species of the Gangrene and Botulinum Groups". Journal of Bacteriology. 53 (2): 139–147. doi:10.1128/JB.53.2.139-147.1947. PMC 518288. PMID 16561257.
- Stadtman, T. C.; McClung, L. S. (1957). "Clostridium Sticklandii Nov. Spec". Journal of Bacteriology. 73 (2): 218–219. doi:10.1128/JB.73.2.218-219.1957. PMC 289777. PMID 13416172.
