= The Road Back =

1931 novel by Erich Maria Remarque

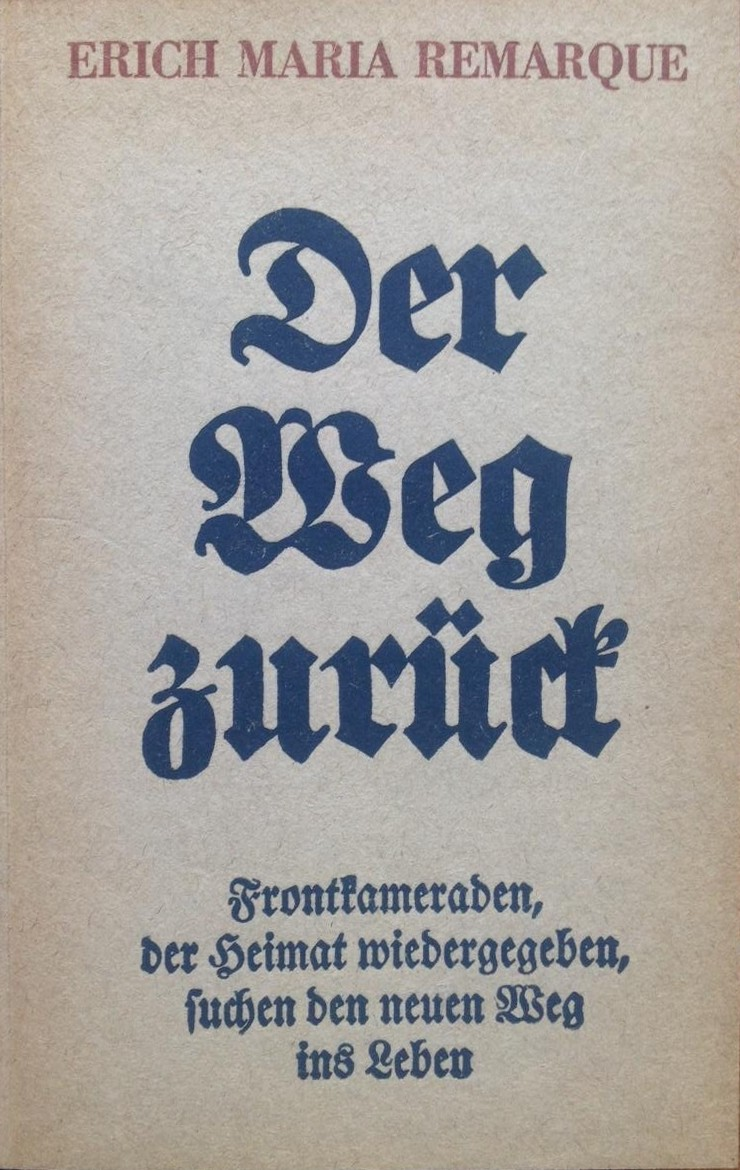
- First edition cover
- Author: Erich Maria Remarque
- Original title: Der Weg zurück
- Translator: Arthur Wesley Wheen
- Language: German
- Genre: War novel
- Publisher: Propyläen Verlag (German); Little, Brown & Co (English)
- Publication date: April 1931
- Publication place: Germany
- English publication date: May 1931
- Media type: Print (Hardback)
- OCLC: 909194
- Preceded by: All Quiet on the Western Front

The Road Back, also translated as The Way Back, (German: Der Weg zurück) is a novel by German author Erich Maria Remarque, commonly regarded as a sequel to his 1929 novel All Quiet on the Western Front. It was first serialized in the German newspaper Vossische Zeitung between December 1930 and January 1931, and published in book form in April 1931.

== Plot ==
Although the book follows different characters from those in All Quiet on the Western Front, it can be assumed that they were in the same company, as the characters recall other characters from the earlier novel. Tjaden is the only member of the 2nd Company to feature prominently in both books.

Set a few weeks after the end of All Quiet on the Western Front, the novel deals with the fall of the German Empire and details the experience of young men in Germany who have returned from the trenches of World War I and are trying to integrate back into civilian life. Its most salient feature is the main characters' pessimism about current society which, they feel, is morally bankrupt because it has allegedly caused the war and apparently does not wish to reform itself.

For example in one scene, a group of student veterans are forced to endure a corny speech by their professor who eulogizes their fallen comrades as having entered a "long sleep beneath the green grasses". The student veterans mock the professor for his naive platitudes with one, Westerholt shouting, "in the mud of shell holes they are lying, knocked rotten, ripped in pieces, gone down into the bog—Green grasses!"

== Reception ==
The book was banned during Nazi rule.

== Preservation ==
Under the Copyright Term Extension Act of 1998, the book will enter the public domain in the United States in 2027, with the first half of the serialized version expiring first in 2026.

== Adaptations ==
- 1937, The Road Back – motion picture directed by James Whale and starring, among others, Noah Beery Jr. and Richard Cromwell.

== English translations ==
- Arthur Wesley Wheen, as The Road Back. Published in 1931 by Little, Brown, and Company, McClelland & Stewart and G.P. Putnam and Co.
- Brian Murdoch, as The Way Back. Published in 2019 by Vintage Classics, ISBN 9781784875268.
