= All Quiet on the Western Front =

1928 novel by Erich Maria Remarque

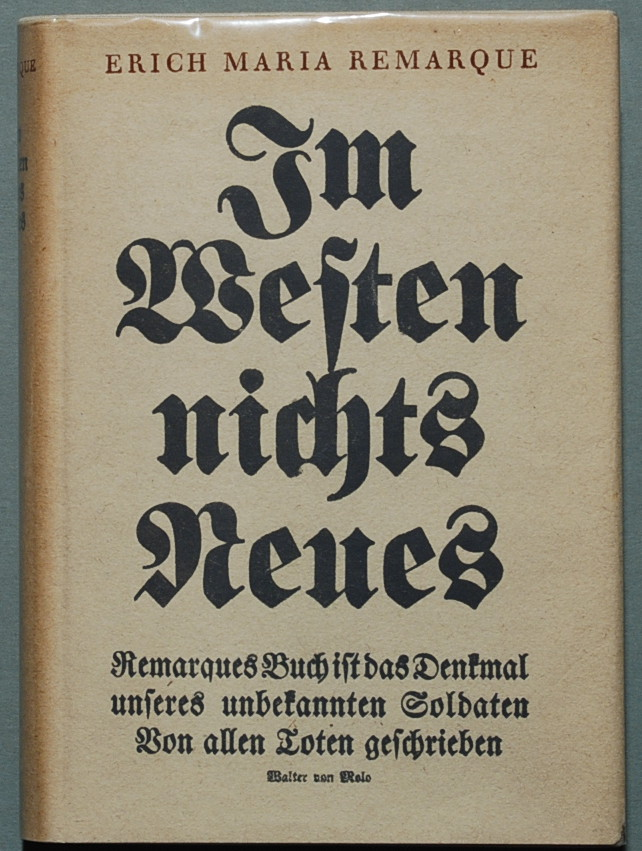
- First edition cover
- Author: Erich Maria Remarque
- Original title: Im Westen nichts Neues
- Translator: A. W. Wheen (1929); Brian Murdoch (1993)
- Illustrator: Carl Laemmle
- Cover artist: Erich Maria Remarque
- Language: German
- Genre: War novel
- Set in: Western Front and Germany, 1916–18
- Publisher: Propyläen Verlag
- Publication date: November–December 1928 (serialisation); 29 January 1929 (book)
- Publication place: Germany
- English publication date: Little, Brown and Company, 1929
- Pages: 250
- Dewey Decimal: 833.912
- LC Class: PT2635.E68
- Followed by: The Road Back
- Text: All Quiet on the Western Front at Wikisource

All Quiet on the Western Front (German: Im Westen nichts Neues, lit. 'In the west, nothing new') is a semi-autobiographical novel by Erich Maria Remarque, a German veteran of World War I. The book describes the German soldiers' extreme physical and mental trauma during the war as well as the detachment from civilian life felt by many upon returning home from the war. It is billed by some as "the greatest war novel of all time".

The novel was first published in November and December 1928 in the German newspaper Vossische Zeitung and in book form in late January 1929. The book and its sequel, The Road Back (1931), were among the books banned and burned in Nazi Germany. All Quiet on the Western Front sold 2.5 million copies in 22 languages in its first 18 months in print.

Three film adaptations of the book have been made, each of which was lauded. The 1930 American adaptation, directed by Lewis Milestone, won two Academy Awards. The 1979 British-American adaptation, a television film by Delbert Mann, won a Golden Globe Award and an Emmy Award. The 2022 German adaptation, directed by Edward Berger, won four Academy Awards.

== Title and translation ==
The 1929 English translation by Arthur Wesley Wheen gives the title as All Quiet on the Western Front. The literal translation of "Im Westen nichts Neues" is "Nothing New in the West", with "West" being the Western Front; the phrase refers to the content of an official communiqué at the end of the novel.

Brian Murdoch's 1993 translation rendered the phrase as "there was nothing new to report on the Western Front" within the narrative. However, in the foreword, he explains his retention of the original translation’s title:

Although it does not match the German exactly, Wheen's title has justly become part of the English language and is retained here with gratitude.

The phrase "all quiet on the Western Front" has become a colloquial expression meaning stagnation, or lack of visible change, in any context.

Murdoch also explains how, owing to the time it was published, Wheen's translation was obliged to Anglicise some lesser-known German references and lessen the impact of certain passages while omitting others entirely. Murdoch's translation is more accurate to the original text and completely unexpurgated.

== Plot summary ==
The book centers on Paul Bäumer, a German soldier on the Western Front during World War I. Before the war, Paul lived with his parents and sister in a charming German village. He attended school, where the patriotic speeches of his teacher Kantorek led the whole class to volunteer for the Imperial German Army shortly after the start of the Great War. At the training camp, where they meet Himmelstoß, his class is scatterd labourers, with whom they soon become friends. Bäumer arrives at the Western Front with his friends and schoolmates (Albert, Kemmerich, Leer, Müller, and a number of other characters). There they meet Stanislaus Katczinsky, an older recalled reservist, nicknamed Kat, who becomes Paul's mentor.

"We are not youth any longer. We don't want to take the world by storm. We are fleeing from ourselves, from our life. We were eighteen and had begun to love life and the world; and we had to shoot it to pieces"

— Paul Bäumer, chapter five (Arthur Wheen translation)

While fighting at the front, Bäumer and his comrades engage in frequent battles and endure the treacherous and filthy conditions of trench warfare. The battles fought here have no names and only meager pieces of land are gained, which are often lost again later. Remarque often refers to the living soldiers as old and dead, emotionally drained and shaken.

Paul visits home, and the contrast with civilian life highlights the cost of the war on his psyche. The town has not changed since he went off to war, but he has: he finds that he does "not belong here any more, it is a foreign world". Paul recovers the books and writings he had left in his childhood room but finds his passion for literature to have been completely erased by the trauma of war. He feels disconnected from most of the townspeople, who ask him "stupid and distressing" questions about his experiences or lecture him about strategy and advancing to Paris while insisting that Paul and his friends know only their "own little sector" but nothing of the big picture. The only person he remains connected to is his dying mother, with whom he shares a tender yet restrained relationship. In the end he concludes that he "ought never to have come [home] on leave."

Paul is glad to return and reunite with his comrades. Soon after, he volunteers to go on a patrol and kills a Frenchman in hand-to-hand combat for the first time. He watches the man die slowly in agony for hours. He is remorseful and devastated, asking for forgiveness from the man's corpse. He later confesses to Kat and Albert, who try to comfort him and reassure him that it is only part of the war. Paul and his company receive a temporary reprieve from the horrid rations and living conditions of the trenches when they are instead sent to a supply depot in an occupied French town. They enjoy food and luxuries taken from the depot or looted from the town but continue to lose men to Allied shelling, culminating in Paul and Albert being wounded while evacuating civilians and needing to be diverted to a Catholic hospital far behind the lines. Albert eventually has his leg amputated, whilst Paul is deemed fit for service and returned to the front.

By the closing months of the war German morale is almost non-existent as the men realize they are fighting only to delay an armistice. The Americans have recently joined the war as both they and the British begin outperforming the far more poorly equipped Germans. In despair Paul watches as his friends fall one by one. Kat's death is the last straw that finally causes Paul to lose his will to live. In the final chapter he comments that peace is coming soon but he does not see the future as bright and shining with hope. He feels that he has no aims left in life and that their generation will be different and misunderstood.

In October 1918 Paul is killed on a remarkably peaceful day. The situation report from the frontline states a simple phrase: "All quiet on the Western Front." Paul's corpse displays a calm expression on its face, "as though almost glad the end had come."

== Themes ==
"One of the great legacies of World War I is that as soon as the Armistice is signed, the enemy is war itself, not the Germans, Russians, or French. The book captures it and becomes the definitive anti-war statement of the Great War"

— Dr. Thomas Doharty

At the beginning of the book, Remarque writes, "This book is to be neither an accusation nor a confession, and least of all an adventure, for death is not an adventure to those who stand face to face with it. It will try simply to tell of a generation of men who, even though they may have escaped (its) shells, were destroyed by the war." The book does not focus on heroic stories of bravery, but rather gives a view of the conditions in which the soldiers find themselves. The monotony between battles, the constant threat of artillery fire and bombardments, the struggle to find food, the lack of training of young recruits (meaning lower chances of survival), and the overarching role of random chance in the lives and deaths of the soldiers are described in detail.

Another major theme is the concept of blind nationalism. Remarque often emphasizes that the boys were not forced to join the war effort against their will, but rather by a sense of patriotism and pride. Kantorek called Paul's platoon the "Iron Youth", teaching his students a romanticized version of warfare with glory and duty to the Fatherland. It is only when the boys go to war and have to live and fight in dirty, cramped trenches with little protection from enemy bullets and shells while contending with hunger and sickness that they realize just how dispiriting it is to actually serve in the army.

== Characters ==
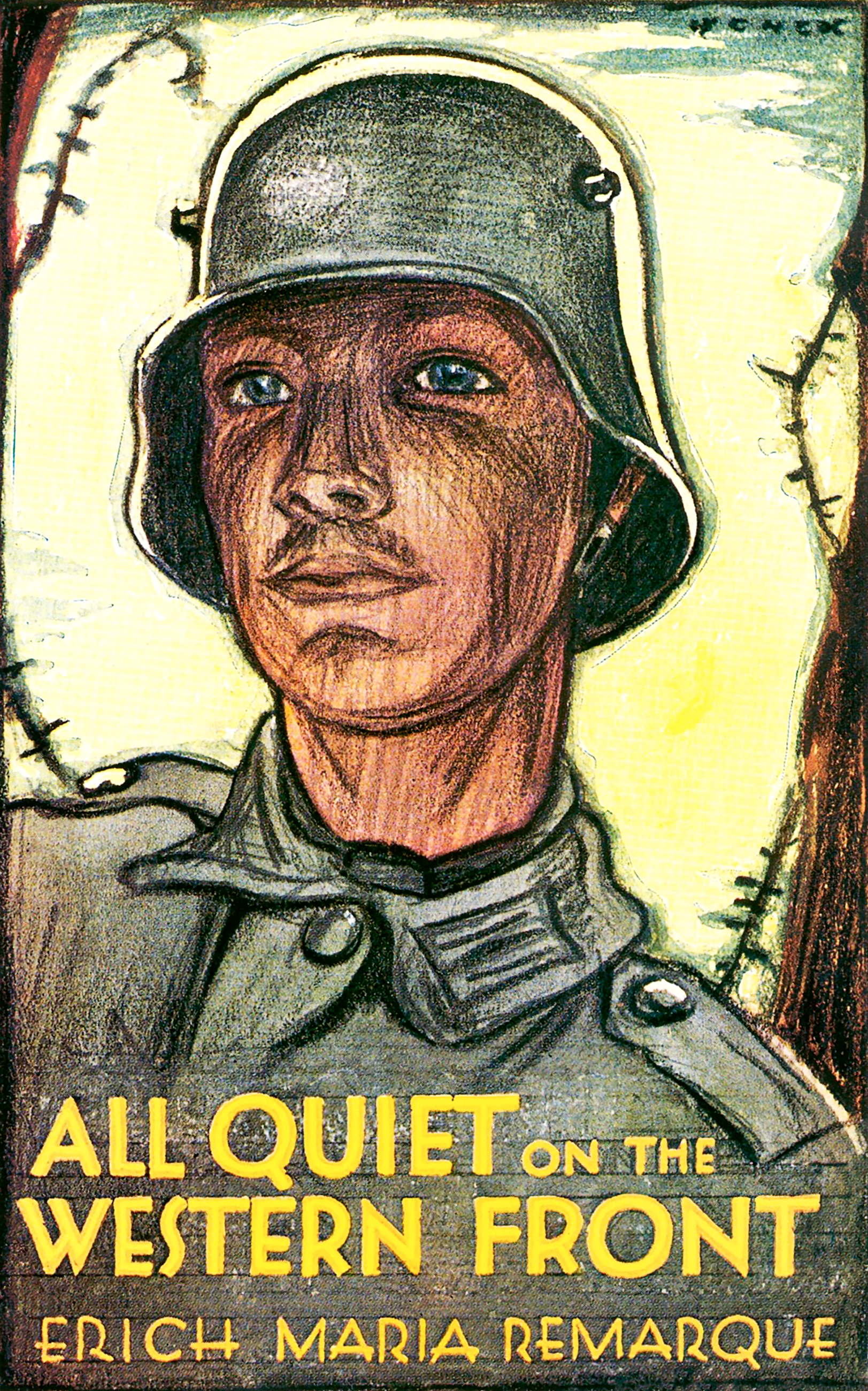
Cover of the first English-language edition. The design is based upon a German war bonds poster by Fritz Erler.

- Paul Bäumer: The narrator and protagonist of the story, Paul is a thoughtful and sensitive young man who serves as the reader's guide through the horrors of war. He is nineteen years old and joined the army straight out of school along with his classmates. Paul undergoes a profound transformation as he experiences the dehumanizing effects of war and grapples with the trauma of killing. His internal monologues reveal his growing disillusionment, his longing for peace, and his struggle to retain his humanity.
- Albert Kropp: Kropp is in Paul's class at school and is described as the clearest thinker of the group as well as the smallest. Kropp is wounded towards the end of the novel and undergoes a leg amputation. Both he and Bäumer end up spending time in a Catholic hospital together, Bäumer suffering from shrapnel wounds to the leg and arm.
- Haie Westhus: Haie is tall and strong with a good sense of humor, and a peat-digger by profession. His size and behavior make him seem older than Paul, yet he is the same age as Paul and his school-friends, who are roughly 19 at the start of the book. During combat, he is fatally injured in his back (Chapter 6).
- Friedrich Müller: Müller is one of Bäumer's classmates, and is 19 when he also volunteers to join the German army. He is killed later after being shot point-blank in the stomach with a flare gun.
- Stanislaus "Kat" Katczinsky: Katczinsky, a recalled reserve militiaman, was a cobbler in civilian life. He is older than Paul Bäumer and his comrades, about 40 years old, and serves as their leadership figure.
- Tjaden: One of Bäumer's non-schoolmate friends. Before the war, Tjaden was a locksmith and a big eater with a grudge against the former postman-turned-corporal Himmelstoß.
- Himmelstoß: Sergeant der Reserve Himmelstoß was a village postman before being mobilised for the war and securing a position as a Sergeant in the Landwehr (Reserves of persons 28–39). Himmelstoß is a power-hungry martinet with a special contempt for Paul and his friends, because they knew him as their local postman.

=== Secondary characters ===
- Franz Kemmerich had enlisted with his best friend and classmate, Bäumer, at only 19 years. Kemmerich is shot in the leg early in the story; his injured leg has to be amputated, and he dies shortly after. In anticipation of Kemmerich's imminent death, Müller was eager to get his boots. Paul later visits Kemmerich's mother while on leave, and lies to her that Franz died instantly and painlessly.
- Ludwig Behm was a youthful and overweight student and the only one in Paul's class that was not quickly influenced by Kantorek's patriotism to join the war, but is pressured into volunteering alongside his friends. He is the first of Paul's friends to die. He is blinded in no man's land and believed to be dead by his friends. The next day, when he is seen walking blindly around no man's land, it is discovered that he was only unconscious, but he is killed before he can be rescued.
- Kantorek is the schoolmaster of Paul and his friends, including Kropp, Leer, Müller, and Behm. Behaving "in a way that cost [him] nothing," Kantorek is a strong supporter of the war and encourages Bäumer and other students in his class to join the war effort.
- Mittelstädt is another of Paul's school friends who is promoted to training reservists behind the front, where in a twist of fate he ends up with Kantorek in his unit after the schoolmaster is drafted himself.
- Leer is an intelligent soldier in Bäumer's company, and one of his classmates, and an "old hand" at womanizing and seduction.
- Lieutenant Bertinck is the leader of Bäumer's company. He is shot towards the end of the war while defending his men from a flamethrower team, losing his chin in the same explosion that wounds Leer.
- Detering is a farmer who longs to return to his wife and farm. He is fond of horses and is angered when he sees them used in combat.
- Hamacher is a patient at the Catholic hospital where Paul and Albert Kropp are temporarily stationed.

== Publication and reception ==
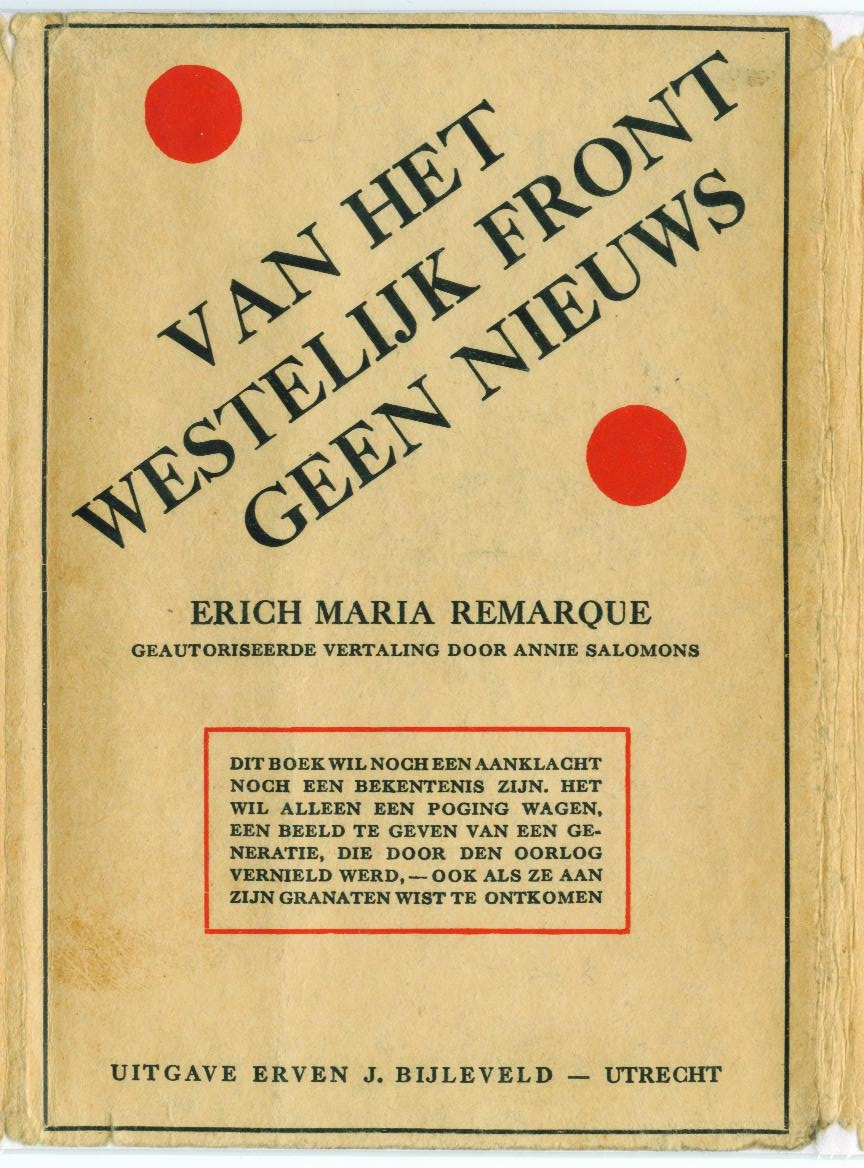
Dutch translation, 1929

From November 10 to December 9, 1928, All Quiet on the Western Front was published in serial form in Vossische Zeitung magazine. It was released in book form the following year to great success, selling one and a half million copies that same year. Although publishers had worried that interest in World War I had waned more than 10 years after the armistice, Remarque's realistic depiction of trench warfare from the perspective of young soldiers struck a chord with the war's survivors—veterans and civilians alike—and provoked strong reactions, both positive and negative, around the world.

With All Quiet on the Western Front, Remarque emerged as an eloquent spokesman for a generation that had been, in his own words, "destroyed by war, even though it might have escaped its shells." Remarque's harshest critics, in turn, were his countrymen, many of whom felt the book denigrated the German war effort, and that Remarque had exaggerated the horrors of war to further his pacifist agenda. The strongest voices against Remarque came from the emerging Nazi Party and its ideological allies. In 1933, when the Nazis rose to power, All Quiet on the Western Front became one of the first degenerate books to be publicly burnt; in 1930, screenings of the Academy Award-winning film based on the book were met with Nazi-organized protests and mob attacks on both movie theatres and audience members.

Objections to Remarque's portrayal of the World War I German soldiers were not limited to those of the Nazis in 1933. Dr. Karl Kroner was concerned about Remarque's depiction of the medical personnel as being inattentive, uncaring, or absent from frontline action. Kroner was specifically worried that the book would perpetuate German stereotypes abroad that had subsided since the First World War. He offered the following clarification: "People abroad will draw the following conclusions: if German doctors deal with their own fellow countrymen in this manner, what acts of inhumanity will they not perpetuate against helpless prisoners delivered up into their hands or against the populations of occupied territory?"

A fellow patient of Remarque's in the military hospital in Duisburg objected to the negative depictions of the nuns and patients and to the general portrayal of soldiers: "There were soldiers to whom the protection of homeland, protection of house and homestead, protection of family were the highest objective, and to whom this will to protect their homeland gave the strength to endure any extremities."

These criticisms suggest that experiences of the war and the personal reactions of individual soldiers to their experiences may be more diverse than Remarque portrays them; however, it is beyond question that Remarque gives voice to a side of the war and its experience that was overlooked or suppressed at the time. This perspective is crucial to understanding the true effects of World War I. The evidence can be seen in the lingering depression that Remarque and many of his friends and acquaintances were suffering a decade later.

The book was also banned in other European countries on the grounds that it was considered anti-war propaganda; Austrian soldiers were forbidden from reading the book in 1929, and Czechoslovakia banned it from its military libraries. The Italian translation was also banned in 1933. During the remilitarization of Germany under the Nazi Party, the book was banned as it was deemed counterproductive to German rearmament. In contrast, All Quiet on the Western Front was trumpeted by pacifists as an anti-war book.

Remarque makes a point in the opening statement that the novel does not advocate any political position, but is merely an attempt to describe the experiences of the soldier. Historian Mitch Horowitz, who wrote the introduction for the 2025 digital publication of the novel, has noted that Remarque's apolitical approach is refreshing in today's highly factionalist era, and that Remarque "joins the ranks of chroniclers of warfare from Plutarch to Stephen Crane—finding the story in the trenches and within the lives of combatants rather than in long-forgotten disputes that supposedly drove the conflict," adding, "Remarque has been justly compared to Hemingway."

Much of the literary criticism came from Salomo Friedlaender, who wrote a book Hat Erich Maria Remarque wirklich gelebt? "Did Erich Maria Remarque really live?" (under the pen name Mynona), which was, in its turn, criticized in: Hat Mynona wirklich gelebt? "Did Mynona really live?" by Kurt Tucholsky. Friedlaender's criticism was mainly personal in nature—he attacked Remarque as being egocentric and greedy. Remarque publicly stated that he wrote All Quiet on the Western Front for personal reasons, not for profit, as Friedlaender had charged.

All Quiet on the Western Front was followed in 1931 by The Road Back, which follows the surviving characters after the Treaty of Versailles, and the two are considered part of a trilogy alongside the narratively unrelated Three Comrades, released in 1936 and set well into the post-war era.

== Adaptations ==
=== Films ===
The sound (left) and silent (right) versions of All Quiet on the Western Front
- All Quiet on the Western Front, a 1930 American film directed by Lewis Milestone, starring Louis Wolheim, Lew Ayres, John Wray, Arnold Lucy, and Ben Alexander. Recipient of two Oscars, including Best Picture at the 3rd Academy Awards.
- All Quiet on the Western Front, a 1979 CBS television film by Delbert Mann, starring Richard Thomas and Ernest Borgnine. The film won the Golden Globe Award for Best Motion Picture Made for Television.
- All Quiet on the Western Front, a 2022 German film directed by Edward Berger, starring Felix Kammerer and Albrecht Schuch. Nominated for nine Oscars, including Best Picture, at the 95th Academy Awards, and winning seven British Academy Film Awards and four Oscars.

=== Comics ===
- "All Quiet on the Western Front", a 1952 comic book adaptation as part of the Classics Illustrated series.

=== Music ===
- "All Quiet on the Western Front", a song from Elton John's 1982 album Jump Up!, written by Elton and Bernie Taupin.

=== Audiobooks ===
- All Quiet on the Western Front, a 2000 Recorded Books audiobook of the text, read by Frank Muller.
- All Quiet on the Western Front, a 2010 Hachette Audio UK audiobook narrated by Tom Lawrence.
- All Quiet on the Western Front, a 2024 Electric City Entertainment audiobook narrated by Frank Cioppettini.

=== Radio ===
- All Quiet on the Western Front, a 2008 radio adaptation broadcast on BBC Radio 3, starring Robert Lonsdale and Shannon Graney, written by Dave Sheasby, and directed by David Hunter.

== See also ==
- Bildungsroman
- List of books with anti-war themes
- Storm of Steel
