= Arthur Wheen =

Australian soldier, translator and museum librarian

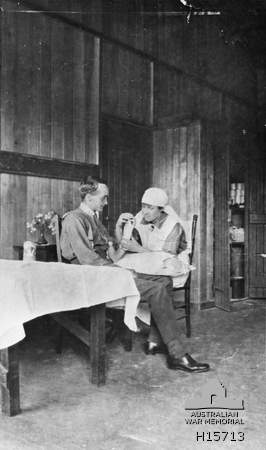
- Lieutenant Wheen at a hospital in England, c.1918
- Born: 9 February 1897; Sunny Corner, Australia
- Died: 15 March 1971 (aged 74); Buckinghamshire, England
- Military career
- Allegiance: Australia
- Branch: Australian Imperial Force
- Service years: 1915–1919
- Rank: Lieutenant
- Conflicts: First World War
- Awards: Military Medal & Two Bars
- Other work: Librarian and translator

Arthur Wesley Wheen, MM & Two Bars (9 February 1897 – 15 March 1971) was an Australian soldier, translator and museum librarian. He is best known for translating the works of Erich Maria Remarque into English, beginning with the classic war novel All Quiet on the Western Front in 1929.

== Early life and education ==
He was the son of Clara and Harold Wheen, who was a Wesleyan Minister. His father was transferred to Sydney in 1910, where young Arthur attended Gordon Public School and Sydney Boys High School. In 1915, he won admission to Sydney Teachers College and later attended the University of Sydney, where he studied the fine arts.

== First World War ==
Wheen was eighteen years and eight months old when he enlisted in the Australian Imperial Force on 15 October 1915. Two months later, he embarked as a reinforcement for the 1st Australian Battalion and arrived in Egypt when the Australian Army in Egypt was being expanded from two to four divisions. He was transferred to the newly formed 54th Battalion of the 5th Australian Division where he served as a signaller. The battalion trained at a military base near Tel-el-Kebir before moving with the rest of the division to France in June 1916.

He was awarded the Military Medal (MM) for braving enemy artillery barrages to repair telephone lines and maintain communications at Fromelles in July 1916. Later, two bars would be added to his medal, one at Beaulencourt in 1917 and the second at Villers-Bretonneux in 1918. He was one of only fifteen Australians to receive three Military Medals. He was appointed lance corporal in January 1918 and promoted corporal a week later. Later in 1918 he attended an officers' training course in Oxford and was commissioned lieutenant in August. He was twice wounded (in 1917 and 1918). Wheen was invalided to England in September 1918 and returned to Australia reaching Sydney on 5 January 1919.

== Later years ==
He promptly returned to Sydney University to complete his studies. In 1920, he was awarded a Rhodes Scholarship and left Australia to study Modern History at New College, Oxford, graduating in 1923. He was soon able to secure a position at the Victoria and Albert Museum, where he was appointed "Keeper of the Library" in 1945, remaining in that post until his retirement in 1962. In his later years, he dabbled in etching and pottery, as well as writing the occasional magazine article.

== Bibliography ==
In 1929, when Erich Maria Remarque published Im Westen Nichts Neues, Wheen was quick to read it and compare it with his own experiences, which prompted him to do a translation, rendering the title as All Quiet on the Western Front. It received excellent reviews and is still considered to be the standard English version of that work. He went on to translate two more novels by Remarque: Der Weg Zurück (The Road Back, 1931) and Drei Kameraden (Three Comrades, 1937).

His other translations from the German include: Four Infantrymen on the Western Front 1918 by Ernst Johanssen (1930); The Kaiser Goes: The Generals Remain by Theodor Plivier (1933) and Virgil, Father of the West by Theodor Haecker (1934).

His only original work was a novella, Two Masters, first published in the London Mercury in November 1924.

A biography, The other side of no man's land: Arthur Wheen World War I hero; scholar and pacifist by John Ramsland was published in 2015.

== See also ==
- Brian O. Murdoch

== Bibliography ==
- We Talked of Other Things: The Life and Letters of Arthur Wheen 1897–1971, edited by Tanya Crothers. Woollahra, N.S.W.: Longueville Media (2011) ISBN 978-0-9870570-1-3
