= Christophe Roberts =

American artist

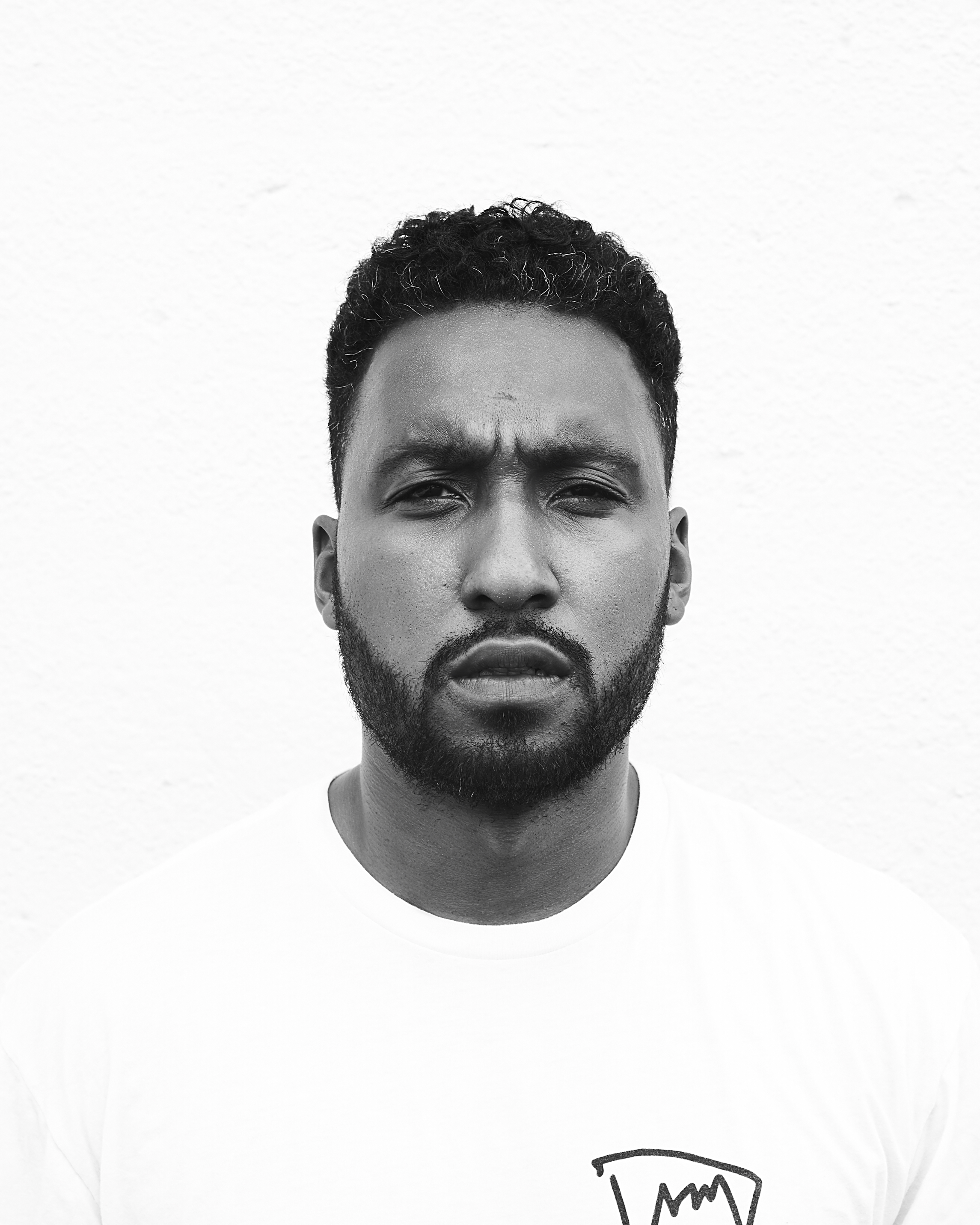
- Born: Christophe Roberts; March 26, 1980 (age 46); Chicago, Illinois, U.S.
- Education: Cornish College of the Arts in Seattle
- Known for: Artist
- Website: christopheroberts.com

Christophe Roberts (born March 26, 1980) is a Bahamian-American multidisciplinary artist working in sculpture, graphic design, painting, and creative direction. His work explores masculinity, personal history, and consumerism by repurposing everyday objects such as building materials and up-cycled Nike shoeboxes. He has said, “A true artist can use all the tools in his box. His style transcends through multiple platforms, from digital, to organic, to textile.”.

== Early life ==
Roberts was born on the north side of Chicago in 1980. His mother, now retired, is a Chicago-based educator from Opelika, Alabama. She was a teacher, and later a principal at Brentano Math & Science Academy. His father was a government accountant born in the Abaco Islands, Bahamas . Roberts cites his mother, childhood neighbor, and his aunt, Gloria Ward, as early influences . Ward worked as a production and fashion designer for legendary artists such as Marlena Shaw, Tom Joyner, Stanley Turrentine, Stephanie Mills, Maurice Hines, and on the original Teenage Mutant Ninja Turtles (1990) film. From an early age, Roberts participated in art programs and live painting. He was reared in various Chicago neighborhoods surrounded by literature, graphic novels, and fashion books. His cousin, Ashaki Ward, is a choreographer and dancer who worked with performers like Heavy D and R. Kelly. At 15, Roberts joined Peanut Gallery, a Chicago hip-hop crew. He cites dancer, rapper, producer, and graffiti artist Anacron (Artist) as a role model in his youth. The works of Todd McFarlane, HR Giger, Katsuhiro Otom, the movies Wild Style (1983) and Akira (1988) are early source materials . Roberts has said he viewed a KRS-One concert as an art piece that impacted his multidisciplinary inclinations.

== Education ==
Roberts attended Ogden Public School and Francis W. Parker School in Chicago. He earned his BFA at Cornish College of the Arts in Seattle. His studies in the Design Department included illustration, film, web design, welding, and music. Although Cornish did not have a study abroad program, Roberts pursued independent study at Oxford Brookes University, United Kingdom. During his year in Europe, Roberts visited museums and was inspired to focus on painting after seeing pieces by Pablo Picasso and Euan Uglow in person. Following graduation, Roberts remained in Seattle for three years, selling modern cubist paintings (using doors as canvases) in coffee shops, on the main drag, and to local drug dealers. In this time Christophe Roberts also produced and recorded over 100 songs, releasing an album of hip-hop and electronic music .

== Career ==
Roberts returned to Chicago in 2006, working as a bar back at a club while selling his paintings. Over the next several years, Roberts participated in numerous group shows, establishing relationships with major art spaces/culture-makers such as Afropunk, Columbia College, DePaul Art Museum, Chicago Art Department, and Zhou B Art Center. After a string of successful shows in 2010, Lyons Weir Gallery (New York) began representing Roberts . At this time, Christophe Roberts was painting large animal figures and working in graphic design. It was in this period Christophe Roberts innovated his celebrated and widely commissioned sculptures made from Nike shoeboxes. He is the only known artist working with these materials, and is featured on Nike's website . About this work, Roberts has said the animal figures are a “metaphor for his emotions” and ambitions. Roberts was encouraged to vary his practice and processes when considering Renaissance artists, about whom he says, “always had a team that helped push forward their vision. They were not only artists, they were poets, they were architects, they were painters, they were muralists. ” Following the flooding of his studio space in Pilsen, and a car accident that required five months of physical therapy, Roberts decided to move to Harlem. He immediately began work in the fashion industry designing t-shirts for major brands while maintaining a studio in Greenpoint, Brooklyn. Roberts sold pieces from his studio, via his gallery, and through New York collector Gabriel Schumann. In 2013, Oliver “Power” Grant of Wu-Tang Clan invited Roberts to collaborate on a show for Wallplay Gallery. That same year, Roberts installed at the Complex Magazine office. Coincidentally, Roberts shares a birthday with the 1980 release date of the Air Max. His ongoing commissions with Nike have included sculptures at NikeLab storefront in Soho, the Manhattan flagship store, and the Kobe IV shoe release at the Staples Center in Los Angeles. In 2016, Roberts was selected as a Nike Master of Air. His work has been featured in art journals, and on lifestyle and culture brands .

Christophe Roberts currently exhibits works in sculpture and design, in addition to paintings. Roberts lives in Brooklyn.

== Exhibitions ==
=== 2016 ===
Nike Airmax Con, New York, NY

=== 2014 ===
Initiative Gallery, New York, NY

=== 2013 ===
- Wallplay Gallery, New York, NY

=== 2010 ===
- Re -Gallery, Solo Exhibition (9 Window displays), Chicago, IL
- Lyons Wier Gallery, New York, Ny
- Little Black Pearl, Chicago, IL
- Scion Art Event, Chicago, IL
- DePaul Art Museum, Group Show, Chicago, IL
- Action, Group Show, Chicago Art Department Gallery, Chicago, IL
- Center Line, Group Show, Zhou B Art Center, Chicago, IL
- Cardboard Annual Group Show, Co-Prosperity Sphere Gallery, Chicago Il
- Next Chicago, Lyons Weir Gallery, Chicago, IL
- Group Show, The Hive Gallery, Los Angeles, CA
- Live Painting, Victor Hotel, Chicago, IL

=== 2009 ===
- Art/Design Lecture, Columbia College, Chicago, IL
- Live Painting, Q4 Space, Chicago, IL
- Live Painting. Converse Afro Punk Tour, Chicago, Il
- New Work, Swim Café, Chicago, IL

=== 2008 ===
- Down Under, Black Swan Sponsored Art Event, Chicago, IL
- Ski Mask Way, Artistic Genius Gallery, Chicago, IL

=== 2006 ===
- Gravity is Too Expensive. Pilsen Art Loft, Chicago, Il

=== 2005 ===
- Giant Robot Show, Capital Hill Arts Center, Seattle, WA
- Gallery of the Senses, Seattle, Wa
- Group Show, Langston Hughes Art Center, Seattle, WA

=== 2004 ===
- Beyond Fresh, Group Show, Seattle, WA
- Mixed Media Works, Auto Gallery, Seattle, WA
- Sundiata Art Festival, Seattle Center, Seattle, WA

=== 2002 ===
- Loft Exhibition, Portland, Oregon
- Nation Gallery, Seattle, WA
- Café Vita, Seattle, WA
