= Giorgos Themelis =

Greek writer (1900–1976)

Giorgos Themelis (Greek: Γιώργος Θέμελης; August 23, 1900 – April 17, 1976) was a Greek poet, essayist and playwright.

== Biography ==
He was born in 1900 in Samos and studied at the School of Philosophy of Athens University. In 1930 he moved to Thessaloniki where he lived for the rest of his life. He taught philology in secondary education and he reached the rank of headmaster which he held until his retirement. He was also teacher of the State Conservatory of Thessaloniki.

Themelis was one of the founding members of the literary magazine Macedonian Times and the Thessaloniki Writers Society. He also cooperated with other magazines and journals including Nea Estia, Kochlias and Nea Poreia. From 1961 until 1965 he served as a member of the artistic board of directors of the National Theatre of Northern Greece under Sokratis Karantinos. Themelis’ first short story was published in 1929 while his first poetic collection,The Naked Window, was published in 1945. Other works of Themelis are the awarded poetic collections Dentrokipos (1955) and Fotoskiaseis (1961), essays, plays and also translations. He twice won the National Literature Award for poetry in 1956 and 1962.

He died on April 17, 1976. He was married to Lemonia Antaraki, with whom he had five children (3 daughters and 2 sons).
