= Amy Cripps Vernon =

English author

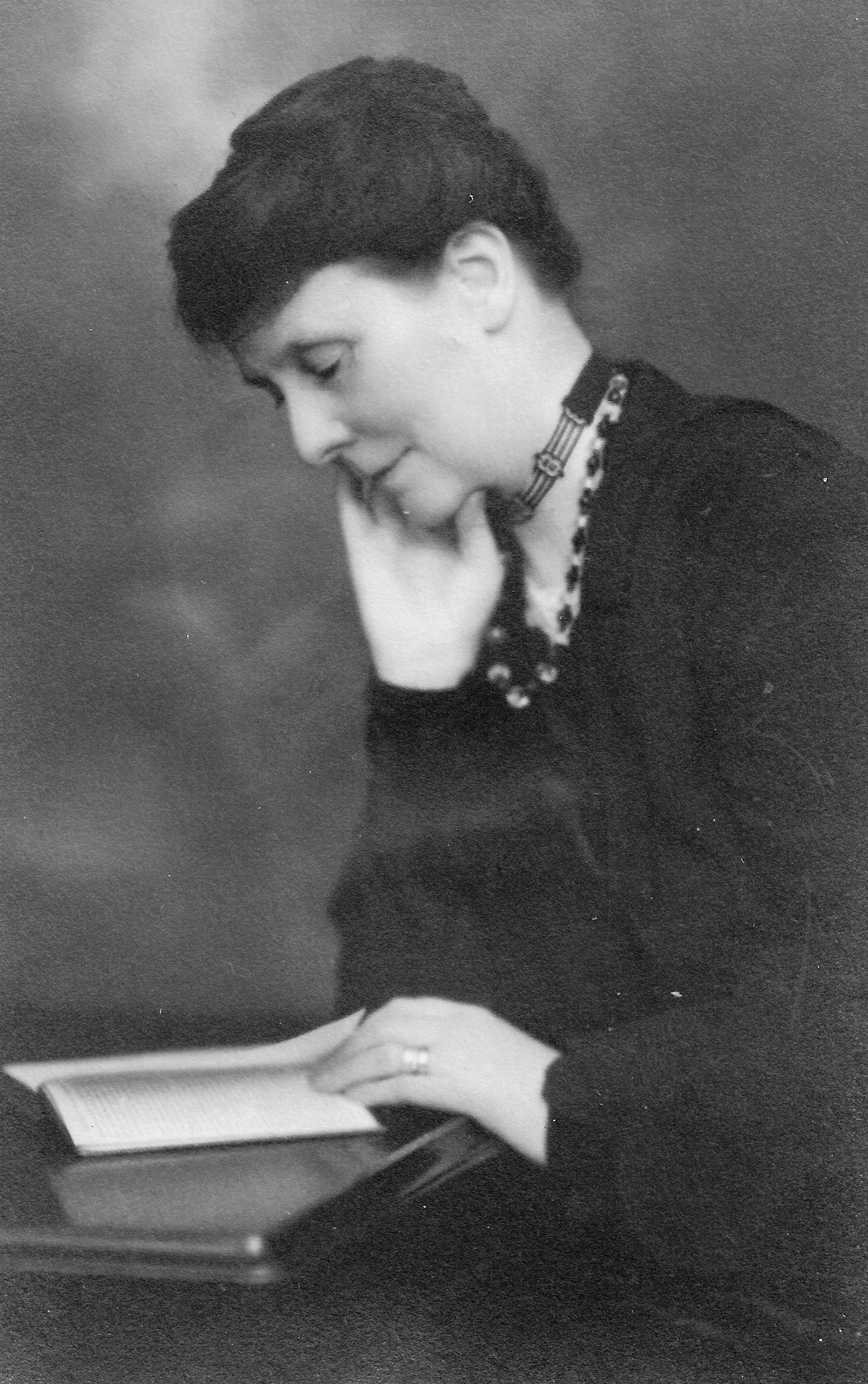
- Born: 18 December 1869; St. Marylebone, London, England
- Died: 2 April 1956; Sheffield, Yorkshire, United Kingdom
- Occupation: Writer
- Writing career
- Genre: children's literature

Amy Cripps Vernon (née Young; 18 Dec 1869 – 2 August 1956) was an English writer of children's books, which were published in the early part of the 20th century. Many of her books were published by the Christian Knowledge Society (later the Society for Promoting Christian Knowledge), and provided moral instruction that reflected the era in which she lived.

Her father, Thomas Grant Young (1843–1897), and her husband, Thomas Pallister Barkas Vernon (1859 - 22 Feb 1900), were both ministers in the Catholic Apostolic Church.

== Works ==
- Thoughts and Dreamings (1896, as 'Amy Cripps Young')
- Short Tales for the Nursery
- Short Stories for Little People
- Sisha (1906)
- Gerald's Chum (1908)
- Little Sir Galahad (1909)
- Bennie's Boy (1910)
- Half-a-Dozen Cousins
- Betty and Priscillia (1913)
- Colin and Joan (1914)
- Derek's Hero (1914)
- Geoffrey (1915)
