= Antoni Uniechowski =

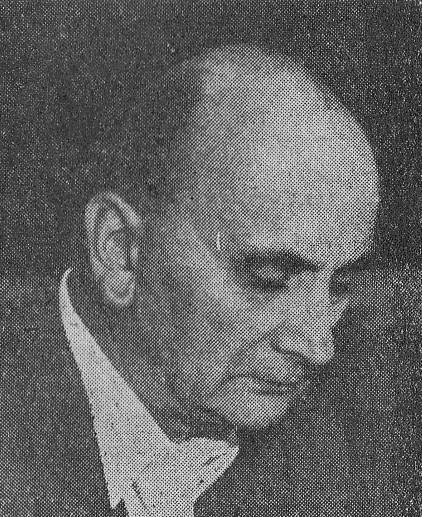
GAntoni Unichowski

Antoni Uniechowski (23 February 1903 in Wilno - 28 May 1976 in Warsaw) was a Polish illustrator.

Antoni Uniechowski was born in Wilno to Janusz Radogost-Uniechowski of the Clan of Ostoja and Zofia née Jelska. He spent his childhood at the family house in Belarus. As a child, he was often ill, as a consequence spending his time in bed constantly drawing. As a result of the Bolshevik Revolution in 1917, the Uniechowski family lost its properties and the family was forced to move to Warsaw.

In 1924-1930 he studied at the School of Fine Arts in Warsaw. He focused on posters, film and theatre scenography and most of all the book illustrations. He made light ink illustrations enriched with watercolors or gouache. He illustrated nearly 200 classic books published in Poland, e.g. Voltaire's Powiastki filozoficzne (1948), Henryk Sienkiewicz's Potop (1949), Ignacy Krasicki's Monachomachia (1953), Stefan Żeromski's Popioły (1954), Mark Twain's The Prince and the Pauper (1954), Frances Burnett's A Little Princess (1959), Bolesław Prus' Lalka (1962) and Emancypantki (1972). He also illustrated numerous postcards, often with themes of Warsaw's architecture.

He received numerous awards, including the Knight's Cross of the Order of Polonia Restituta awarded in 1955. Antoni Uniechowski died on 28 May 1976 in Warsaw and was buried at the Powązki Military Cemetery.

== See also ==
- Ostoja coat of arms
- Clan of Ostoja
- Drawings gallery
- Antoni Uniechowski at Art Gallery Katarzyna Napiórkowska in Poland
