= Tamara Vakhvakhishvili =

Georgian Soviet Era Composer

Composer Tamara Nikolayevna Vakhvakhishvili (23 December 1893 – 10 October 1976) was born in Warsaw, but lived much of her life in Georgia, where she was awarded the title of Honored Artist of the Georgian Soviet Socialist Republic.

Vakhvakhishvili studied piano and composition at the music school in Tbilisi, Georgia (today the Tbilisi State Conservatoire). From 1921 to 1923, she served as the director of the school. From 1922 to 1926, she headed the music department of the Rustaveli Theatre in Tbilisi. In 1927, Vakhvakhishvili studied composition with Paul Vidal at the Paris Conservatoire. She met artist and set designer David Kakabadze while she was in Paris, and later worked with him at the Kutaisi-Batumi State Drama Theater. She worked at the Marjanishvili Theatre from 1928 to 1933, then moved to Moscow. In 1940, she was awarded the title of Honored Artist of the Georgian Soviet Socialist Republic.

== List of compositions ==
Vakhvakhishvili's compositions included:

=== Ballet ===
- Bacchus' Holiday
- Herb of Love
- Spartacus

=== Orchestra ===
- Dance Suite
- March of the Heroes
- Symphonic Etude
- Violin Concerto

=== Theatre ===
- Don Khil (musical comedy)
- Iranian Pantomime
- Khandzari (pantomime)
- Mzetamzem (pantomime)
- Uriel Acosta (tragedy in three acts)

=== Vocal ===
- Cantata (solo voice, choir and orchestra; text by B. Bronevsky and Nikolai Tikhonov)
- Citation (solo voice and orchestra; text by Shota Rustaveli; Russian translation by Konstantin Balmont)
- Georgian Folk Ballad (orator and orchestra)
