= Ellamarie Woolley =

San Diego artist (1913–1976)

- Jackson and Ellamarie Woolley
- Born: Ellamarie Packard; 1913; San Diego, California
- Died: 1976 (aged 62–63)
- Education: San Diego State College; Los Angeles Art Center
- Known for: Enamel art, murals
- Spouse: Jackson Woolley

Ellamarie Woolley (1913–1976) was an American enamel artist, muralist, and educator. She and her husband, Jackson Woolley (1910-1992) collaborated on enamel pieces. The School of Art+Design at San Diego State University established a scholarship in her name.

== Early life and education ==
Born in San Diego, California as Ellamarie Packard, Woolley studied art at San Diego State College and Los Angeles Art Center.

== Career ==
Ellamarie Woolley, Women with Birds, Ceramic Tiles, 15 x 20 inches

=== Enamel artist with Jackson Woolley ===
She met her husband Jackson Woolley while working as an art teacher at Francis W. Parker School (San Diego). They learned the craft together and created enamel pieces collaboratively until 1965, when they started producing works independently.

They worked mostly in enamel on copper but also created art works in Plexiglas and plastic. Her works were exhibited at the California Ceramics Exhibition in 1948 at the Florence Rand Lang Galleries by the Fine Arts Foundation of Scripps College, Claremont. In 1964, the Woolleys were commissioned to make copper reliefs and wall ornamentation for the interior of San Diego Civic Theatre. (Note: Over time, many of the components of the work were removed by the theater staff, leaving it incomplete, and it was taken down at the request of Jackson Woolley in 1979. Many of the pieces were sold, but in 2011 the City of San Diego Commission for Arts and Culture took possession of the "Sun" compositions.) An exhibit of Ellamarie and Jackson's paintings, enamels, and constructions was held between October 7 and November 7, 1968, at The Renaissance Society at University of Chicago.

=== Muralist ===
Woolley painted two murals on the campus of San Diego State College in 1936, Packing Oranges and Sailors Going to Hell, as part of a group commissioned with WPA funds. These murals were removed from their location at some point after 1959 and have not been located.

== Legacy ==
A retrospective of her work was held in 1977 at the Fine Arts Gallery of San Diego. The School of Art+Design at San Diego State University (formerly San Diego State College) established a scholarship in her name, the Ellamarie Woolley Art Student Assistance Scholarship.

== External Resources ==
- Examples of work from the Enamel Arts Foundation website
- Mingei International Museum
- Los Angeles Times website
