= Malachi Whitaker =

English writer (1895–1976)

Marjorie Whitaker
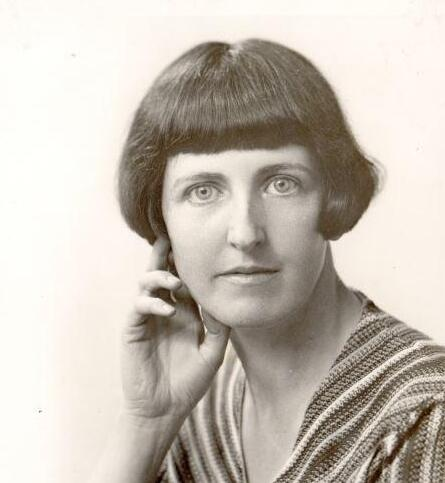
- Born: 23 September 1895; Bradford
- Died: 7 January 1976 (aged 80); Skipton
- Occupation: writer
- Writing career
- Pen name: Malachi Whitacker
- Genres: short story and memoir

Marjorie Olive Whitaker, née Taylor (23 September 1895, Bradford – 7 January 1976, Skipton), better known under her pseudonym Malachi Whitaker, was an English writer, noted for her short stories and an autobiography. She wrote nearly 100 stories published in four collections by Jonathan Cape in the 1920s and 1930s. Following the publication of her memoir And so did I in 1939, she announced her retirement from writing.

== Biography ==
Whitaker was born in 1895 in Clara Road, Wrose in Bradford, the eighth of eleven children. She left school when she was 13, and worked for her father in writing greeting cards for his bookbinding works. She was worried that her writing was not original enough until she allowed some of her stories to be included in an amateur publication that was bound by her father's business.

She married Leonard Whitaker who was then a soldier in 1917, and the couple adopted two children. Her husband's business took them to Rouen and they were abroad for some years. 1926 saw them in a house in Yorkshire and she obtained a typewriter. Her first new story was sent to John Middleton Murry and he published five of her stories in The Adelphi in eighteen months.

She wrote nearly 100 stories published in four collections by Jonathan Cape in the 1920s and 1930s. Her talent was recognized by contemporaries: Vita Sackville-West compared her to Katherine Mansfield, and she was known as the 'Bradford Chekhov'. Following the publication of her memoir And so did I in 1939, she announced her retirement from writing.

== Death and legacy ==
She died in 1976. In 2019, Wrose Parish Council funded a blue plaque to be placed on her birthplace.

== Works ==
Short Stories

- Frost in April (1929)
- No Luggage? (1930)
- Five for Silver (1932)
- Honeymoon and Other Stories (1934)
- Selected Stories (1946)
- The Crystal Fountain and Other Stories (1984)
- The Journey Home and Other Stories (2017)

Memoirs

- And so did I (1939)

Humor

- The Autobiography of Ethel Firebrace (1937) (written pseudonymously with Gay Taylor)
