= The Forgotten Daughter =

1933 novel by Caroline Snedeker

- Author: Caroline Snedeker
- Illustrator: Dorothy Lathrop
- Language: English
- Genre: Children's literature
- Publisher: Doubleday
- Publication date: 1933
- Publication place: United States

The Forgotten Daughter is a 1933 children's historical fiction novel written by Caroline Snedeker and illustrated by Dorothy P. Lathrop. Set in the Roman Empire, it follows the life of a young girl, Chloe, after she is enslaved when her father mistakenly abandons her. The book received a Newbery Honor in 1933.

== Plot summary ==
Roman centurion Laevinius is away from his villa when his Greek wife dies giving birth to his daughter, Chloe. Chloe is enslaved, and Laevinius is told that his wife and daughter are both dead, leaves the villa behind, and moves to Rome. Chloe's life is harsh, only brightened by the stories of Melissa, her mother's former friend, suffering abuse at the hands of Davus, her master. One day, Aulus, whose parents own a neighboring villa, is caught in an animal trap while fleeing from Tiberius Gracchus's assassins. Chloe rescues Aulus, and the two fall in love.

A plague breaks out in Rome, killing Laevinius' new family; he flees the city to his villa, reuniting with Chloe after learning she is alive. Laevinius' parents opposed his marrying a Greek, so they lied to him about Chloe's death. Delighted to find her alive, he helps arrange the marriage of Chloe and Aulus.

== Reception ==
The book has been praised for accurate details that show the culture and everyday life of early Rome.
