= Berlin Coal Carrier =

Photograph by August Sander

Berlin Coal Carrier (1929) by August Sander

Berlin Coal Carrier is a black and white photograph taken by August Sander in 1929. This picture was included in his book Face of Our Time (1929) and was part of his project People of the Twentieth Century, where he pictured several people and professions of Germany.

== Description ==
The photograph depicts a coal carrier from Berlin, emerging from the dark cellar of a building into the sunlight. The man of middle age and with a moustache, is of humble social condition, he wears a hat and is dressed poorly, with dirty and worn pants. He takes a step upward the door, while he carries on his left shoulder a wicker basket, presumably with coal. His appearance and profession put him at the lower ranks of the working class of the Weimar Republic. The J. Paul Getty Museum website states: "His place, Sander seems to suggest, is deep inside the bowels of German society — like the dark basement from which he emerges."

== Public collections ==
There are prints of this photograph at the August Sander Archive, in Cologne, the Museum of Modern Art, in New York, and the J. Paul Getty Museum, in Los Angeles.
