= Caroline Snedeker =

American writer

- Born: Caroline Dale Parke; March 3, 1871; New Harmony, Indiana, U.S.
- Died: January 22, 1956; Bay St. Louis, Mississippi, U.S.
- Occupation: Writer
- Writing career
- Pen name: Caroline Dale Owen
- Period: 1911–1956
- Genre: Children's historical fiction
- Notable work: Downright Dencey

Caroline Dale Snedeker née Parke (March 3, 1871 – January 22, 1956) was an American writer, primarily of children's historical novels. Two of her books, Downright Dencey and The Forgotten Daughter, were runners-up for the Newbery Medal. On occasion she used the pen name Caroline Dale Owen.

== Personal life ==
Caroline Dale Parke was born on March 23, 1871, in New Harmony, Indiana, to Nina Dale (Owen) and Charles Augustus Parke, a banker. Her great-grandfather was Robert Owen, one of Britain's first social reformers and industrialists. Her grandfather was David Dale Owen, a geologist for the United States Geological Survey and the first state geologist for the states of Indiana, Kentucky, and Arkansas.

Parke grew up near Mount Vernon, Indiana, in a family with three sisters (Ada Owen, Anna Crawford, and Nina Dale) and a brother (Julius Leonard). The family later moved to Cincinnati, Ohio, where she attended the College of Music. Parke and her sisters performed instrumental concerts to support the family after the death of their father in 1902. Parke, the pianist in the group, later became a music instructor. She married Charles Henry Snedeker in 1903, and moved to Hempstead, New York. Eventually, she moved to Bay St. Louis, Mississippi, and died on January 22, 1956, at the age of 84.

== Career ==
Snedeker's writings consist of 12 or 13 novels for older children or teens and two or three books for adults, along with a handful of other articles, stories and poems. The majority of her novels were inspired by her love for the ancient world and are set in Greece or the Roman Empire. (Note: Historical novels set in ancient Greece: The Coward of Thermopylae or The Spartan, The Perilous Seat, and Theras and His Town (1911 to 1924); Lysis Goes to the Play (1962, posthumous). Set in the Roman Empire: The Forgotten Daughter, The White Isle, Luke's Quest, A Triumph for Flavius (1933 to 1955).) She also based a series on American history. (Note: Historical novels set in America: Seth Way, set in New Harmony; Downright Dencey and The Beckoning Road; and Uncharted Ways, about the 17th-century Quaker martyr Mary Dyer. The Black Arrowhead: Legends of Long Island features the Montauks or their own legends (LSCH: "Montauk Indians—Fiction", OCLC 7104448).) The morals of her time can be found throughout her novels, especially in the texts aimed at young adults.

Snedeker's first book, The Coward of Thermopylae, appeared for adults in 1911. It gained popularity in 1912 when it was reissued for young adults and re-titled The Spartan. The novel is about an Athenian soldier named Aristodemos, who travels to Sparta and trains to fight in Thermopylae. At first considered a coward, he acquits himself with a noble death. The great response to these novels sparked requests for a children's version. In 1924 Snedeker published Theras and His Town (1924). Theras is an eleven-year-old boy who moves from Athens to Sparta where he experiences a brutal life under Spartan control and attempts to escape back to Athens. The Forgotten Daughter (1933) is set in Ancient Rome and is a Newbery Honor Book.

Snedeker also wrote novels based on American history. The best known is Downright Dencey, a 1928 Newbery Honor Book, which tells of a friendship between a Quaker girl and a waif in Nantucket at the early 19th century. In the sequel, The Beckoning Road (1929), Dencey's family moves to New Harmony.

Snedeker also wrote and published several successful romance novels. As a result of her popularity, some of her novels were translated into other languages, including Dutch and German.

== Influences ==
Snedeker's mother and grandmother were influences on her career. She grew up listening to her mother's singing and to her grandmother's stories of New Harmony. This sparked Snedeker's interest in history, writing and music at an early age. Having a close relationship with her mother and grandmother led Snedeker to write Town of the Fearless (1931), about the history of her family and their relation with New Harmony.

== Cultural impact ==
Ongoing themes in Snedeker's novels include nobility and "good, old-fashioned values." Caroline Snedeker was exceptionally interested in history, literature and classical music, which is shown throughout her works.

== Works ==
=== Novels ===
- The Coward of Thermopylae (Doubleday, Page & Co., 1911)
- The Spartan (Doubleday, 1912) – reissue of The Coward of Thermopylae by imprint Country Life Press with decorations by Leon V. Solon, OCLC 4583775
- Seth Way: A Romance of the New Harmony Community (Houghton Mifflin, 1917) – as by Caroline Dale Owen (Mrs. Charles H. Snedeker), LCCN 17-31029
- The Perilous Seat (Doubleday, 1923)
- Theras and His Town, illus. Mary Haring (Doubleday, 1924); 1961 edition illus. Dimitris Davis LCCN 61-13330
- Downright Dencey, illus. Maginel Wright Barney (Doubleday, 1927)
- The Beckoning Road, illus. Manning de Villeneuve Lee (Doubleday, 1929) – sequel to Downright Dencey
- The Black Arrowhead: Legends of Long Island, illus. M.V. Lee (Doubleday, 1929)
- The Forgotten Daughter, illus. Dorothy P. Lathrop (Doubleday, 1933)
- Uncharted Ways, illus. M.V. Lee (Doubleday, 1935) – Authors note: "Margaret Stevenson in these pages is an attempted copy of Mary Dyer" (1611–1660), OCLC 1579009
- The White Isle, illus. Fritz Kredel (Doubleday, 1940)
- Luke's Quest (Doubleday, 1947)
- A Triumph for Flavius, illus. Cedric Rogers (Lothrop, Lee & Shepard, 1955)
- Lysis Goes to the Play, illus. Reisie Lonette (Lothrop, 1962)

=== Nonfiction ===
Snedeker's two non-fiction books in the LC online catalog both carry the Library of Congress Subject Heading "New Harmony (Ind.)—History".

- The Town of the Fearless, by Snedeker "with pictorial supplement and illustrations by Manning de V. Lee" and 6-page bibliography (Doubleday, 1931), LCCN 31-31203
- The Diaries of Donald MacDonald, 1824–1826, ed. and introduced by Snedeker (Indiana Historical Society, 1942), LCCN 42-20629

Two of her novels also feature New Harmony, Indiana: Seth Way and the sequel to Downright Dencey, The Beckoning Road.
