= William G. Vinal =

American naturalist, nature educator and conservationist

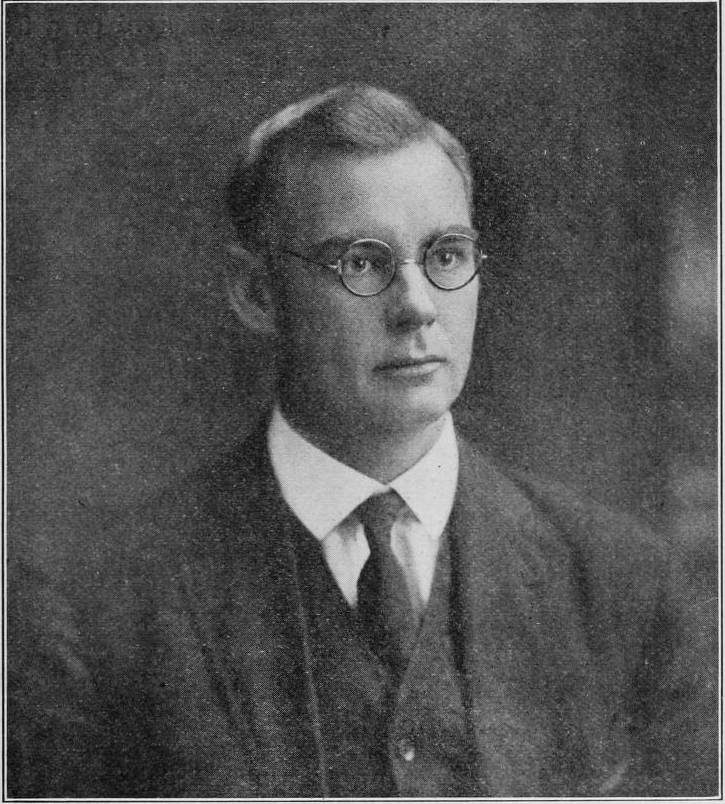
- Professor Vinal in 1922

Biographical details
- Born: November 29, 1881; Norwell, Massachusetts, U.S.
- Died: July 9, 1976 (aged 94); Weymouth, Massachusetts, U.S.
- Education: Bridgewater (MA) (1904)

Coaching career (HC unless noted)
- 1908: Marshall

Head coaching record
- Overall: 0–6

William Gould Vinal (November 29, 1881 – July 9, 1976) was an American naturalist, nature educator, and conservationist who was a faculty at Massachusetts State College—now known as the University of Massachusetts Amherst. He wrote numerous books and papers on nature and outdoors education. He has been called the Father of Nature Recreation. He also served as a college football coach while teaching at Marshall College—now known as Marshall University—in 1908.

== Biography ==
Vinal was born in South Scituate (now Norwell) to William Raymond and Mary Ellen Farrar who worked a farm. His ancestors included William Bradford, Governor of Plymouth Colony and Captain Peter Sears (1753–1821). Growing on a farm he took an interest in farm birds and animals. He went to Bridgewater Normal School and then to Lawrence Scientific School graduating S.B. in 1906. He obtained an A.M. from Harvard University in 1907. During vacations he worked on a variety of jobs including selling ice-cream, transporting vegetables and milking cows. After graduating from Harvard he joined Marshall College State Normal School (now part of Marshall University in Huntington, West Virginia) where he worked for three years teaching geology, geography and biology. Here he also served as the head football coach at for one season, in 1908, compiling a record of 0–6. In 1910 he moved to State Normal School, Salem and in 1911 to the Rhode Island College of Education, Providence. He obtained a PhD from Brown University in 1922. He served as a biologist for the Massachusetts Fish and Game Commission for many summers and also ran Camp Chequasset for nautical training for girls in Cape Cod from 1914 to 1926 and became more familiarly known as "Cap'n Bill", a name he used in many of his educational pamphlets. He also worked as a ranger naturalist in Yosemite and trained "nature counselors" at the Nature Lore School (1920-1926). He became the founding Professor of Nature Education in the Nature Guide School at Massachusetts State College (now University of Massachusetts Amherst) in 1937 and retired in 1951 to Norwell, continuing to lecture and write on nature education.

An active correspondent of contemporary educators (like Anna Comstock) and a prolific writer, he was the member of many societies. He served as a president of the Providence Franklin Society, the R.I. Field Naturalists' Society, the American Nature-Study Society (1921–22) and the Norwell Historical Society (1952–55). He married Lillie Hale Downing, a schoolmate from Bridgewater, in 1908 and they had two children. Vinal died on July 9, 1976, at South Shore Hospital in Weymouth, Massachusetts. A public school in Norwell is named after him as the William Gould Vinal Elementary School.

== Head coaching record ==
Year	Team	Overall	Conference	Standing	Bowl/playoffs
Marshall Thundering Herd (Independent) (1908)
1908	Marshall	0–6			
Marshall:		0–6			
Total:		0–6			
