= André-Léon Vivrel =

French painter

- Born: 8 October 1886; Paris, France
- Died: 7 April 1976 (aged 89); Paris, France
- Known for: Painting

André-Léon Vivrel (8 October 1886 – 7 April 1976), was a French painter and illustrator.

== Biography ==
It was at the age of fifteen that André-Léon Vivrel decided that he would be a painter. After some initial reservation, his family became supportive of his ambition. His mother, Léonie, herself an amateur painter, was the first to support him, encouraging her son, who was later to say that she had been his only master. His very first painting was thanks to her: ‘I remember it well, it was a small landscape, a view of a wood. […] I was about fifteen.’ His father, a wine merchant, proudly recalled that he had himself received a first prize for drawing in 1870, a childhood memory that kept him from forcing his son to join the family business. After obligatory military service, Vivrel entered the Académie Julian in 1910 to study with Paul-Albert Laurens; he also frequented the ateliers of Marcel Baschet and Henri Royer at the École des Beaux-Arts. This was a carefree time: Vivrel never missed the Quat’z’ Arts ball, appearing as a Roman, an Egyptian and a Cro-Magnon man. He rented a studio in Montmartre, the centre of all this revelry, at 65 rue Caulaincourt, only eight numbers along from that of Auguste Renoir.

=== World War I and the return to Paris ===
Vivrel exhibited for the first time at the Salon des Artistes Français in 1913, and again the next year. His career was interrupted by the First World War. Called up on 2 August 1914, he proved his valour at Verdun and was awarded the Croix de guerre for heroic conduct in 1917. That same year, on short leave, he married Germaine Degoul. Before returning to the front, the soldier-painter left his family with a self-portrait in which he represented himself flanked by his mother and his young wife.

After the war Vivrel returned to his studio in Montmartre. With the art market depressed, times were hard, in spite of a Mention Honorable at the 1920 Salon and the purchase by the French state of the two still lifes he sent to the Salon des Indépendants that same year. At this Salon he also exhibited two portraits of Breton women, painted on his return from the fishing port of Ploumanac’h (Côtes d’Armor). The thickly applied paint and loose handling of Vivrel's naturalist portrait recall of the work of Édouard Manet, especially his still lifes.

=== Salons and exhibitions ===
In 1921 Vivrel began regularly exhibiting nudes in the Parisians Salons, reaping a rich harvest of medals and awards. His first attempts in this genre dated from just after the war. In 1922 Vivrel made his first appearance at the Salon de la Société Nationale des Beaux-Arts. In 1932 Vivrel won the Deldebat de Gonzalva prize, and, in 1933, a silver medal at the Salon des Artistes Français for Le Temps des cerises. The following year he exhibited his baigneuses, the first in a series of large-format nudes sent to the Salon up to 1943. Following a long tradition developed by Courbet, Vivrel used the timeless bather theme as a pretext for revelling in painting the female body, almost invariably in a riparian setting. The bathers subject had remained topical and worthily represented at the Salon since the early 20th century by the envois of Émile René Menard, Paul Chabas and Maurice Denis. In Jeunesse (Youth), his submission to the 1936 Salon, Vivrel somewhat humorously captures the modesty of a teenage girl awkwardly using a straw hat to cover her nudity. In these paintings with two or three figures the painter varied the positions of his models following a schema taken from Jeunes filles au bord de la mer by Pierre Puvis de Chavannes. The culmination of his work on painting female nudes, the Baigneuses of 1939, was awarded a gold medal at the Salon des Artistes Français; before this he had won a silver medal at the 1937 Exposition Internationale des Arts et Techniques de Paris, where Henri-Alexandre Sollier also won a prize.

=== The art of landscape ===
He explored the landscape genre continuously throughout his career as he discovered new regions. His base, however, was always the Loiret, where his elder brother, Marcel, had a house in Chatillon-sur-Loire, not far from Champtoceaux, home of Paul Deltombe. It was here, during the penurious period after the war, that he came to live and paint. Neighbours remembered the picturesque figure of the painter cycling along the riverside with a cloche hat pulled down over his ears, a canvas strapped on his back and painting equipment bulging out of his panniers. Thus equipped, he set out for the day to attempt to recapture the ‘instantaneous impression’ of what he observed.

=== The parisian model ===
When not travelling around France, Vivrel took Paris as his model. He painted the alleys of Montmartre and the other evocative neighbourhoods and monuments around the capital, such as Notre-Dame Cathedral, which he represented from every side and at all times of day, and, above all, the banks of the Seine, which afforded so many surprising views of the city. His Parisian views have close affinities to those of Albert Lebourg, in which we find the same quality of atmospheric light and the dissolution of architectural forms in the sky and water of the river. Vivrel was viscerally attached to Paris.

=== Painter of diversity ===
The exhibition organised at Galerie de Berri in May 1942, Vivrel – peinture récentes, featured thirty-one paintings illustrating the diversity of the genres he worked in throughout his career. The artist limited himself to still lifes only when the weather prevented him from getting out of the studio. He painted them without regret, though, since the key thing for him was simply not to stop painting. In old age he recognised that painting had always acted on him like a drug. In the same interview this perfectionist admitted to having destroyed many of his paintings that he found imperfect. This rigour confirmed what critics had seen in him when he was ‘virtually an unknown’: ‘taste, a good eye and accomplishment’ – and this was notwithstanding the illustrious elders, Pierre Bonnard, Henri Lebasque and Pablo Picasso, exhibited alongside Vivrel at Galerie Th. Briant in 1933. Continuing to paint as long as he drew breath, André-Léon Vivrel died in Montmartre on 7 April 1976.

== Works in public institutions ==
- Rochers, 1927. Musée Eugène Boudin, Honfleur
- La Loire à Ousson. Musée Mandet, Riom

== Exhibitions ==
(non-exhaustive list)

- André Vivrel - 29 November - 11 December 1920, Galerie Lorenceau, Paris
- French Naturalist Painters 1890-1950 - 12 June - 7 July 2012, The Fleming Collection, London
