= Paul Weatherwax (botanist) =

American botanist, professor of botany and botanical illustrator

- Born: April 4, 1888 near Worthington, Indiana, US
- Died: October 18, 1976 (aged 88); Bloomington, Indiana, US
- Scientific career
- Fields: Botany
- Author abbrev. (botany): Weatherwax

Paul Weatherwax (1888–1976) was an American botanist, professor of botany, and botanical illustrator.

== Biography ==
He grew up on a farm and graduated from high school in Worthington, Indiana in 1907. He taught school from 1907 to 1909 in Worthington. He took college courses at Wabash College in the spring of 1909 and at DePauw University in the summer session of 1910. From 1910 to 1911 he taught high school, first at Owensburg and then at Freedom. In the spring of 1911 he enrolled at Indiana University Bloomington but he then taught high school for a year at Greencastle. He graduated from Indiana University Bloomington with bachelor's degree in 1914, master's degree in 1915, and PhD in 1918. At Indiana University Bloomington he was an assistant in botany from 1913 to 1915 and an instructor in botany from 1915 to 1918. From 1919 to 1921 he was an associate professor at the University of Georgia. At Indiana University he was an associate professor from 1921 to 1935 and a full professor from 1935 to 1959, when he retired as professor emeritus.

Prior to retirement Dr. Weatherwax headed the teaching group of Indiana University faculty in Bangkok, Thailand, on a Science Education contract with that country, 1957–1959.

From 1960 to 1963 he was a visiting professor at Franklin College. He taught at Hanover College in 1966.

Weatherwax's major areas of research were the morphology of grasses, and the morphology, origin and history of the Indian corn plant.

He travelled to the southeast and the southwest of the United States and to many places in Latin America in connection with his botanical research.

For the Botanical Society of America he served as secretary from 1939 to 1943 and as vice-president in 1944 and again in 1957. He was president of the Indiana Academy of Science in 1941. He held a Waterman fellowship from 1925 to 1930 and a Guggenheim traveling fellowship for the academic year 1944–1945.

He married Anna May Stanton in June 1916. They had several children.

== Selected publications ==
=== Articles ===
- Weatherwax, Paul (1916). "Morphology of the flowers of Zea mays". Bulletin of the Torrey Botanical Club. 43 (3): 127–144. doi:10.2307/2479625. JSTOR 2479625.
- Weatherwax, Paul (1917). "The development of the spikelets of Zea mays". Bulletin of the Torrey Botanical Club. 44 (10): 483–496. doi:10.2307/2479597. JSTOR 2479597.
- "The popping of corn". Proceedings of the Indiana Academy of Science. 31: 149–154. 1921.
- Weatherwax, Paul (1922). "A rare carbohydrate in waxy maize". Genetics. 7 (6): 568–572. doi:10.1093/genetics/7.6.568. PMC 1200546. PMID 17245994.
- "Notes on Grasses". Proceedings of the Indiana Academy of Science. 33: 223–224. 1923.
- Weatherwax, Paul (May 1930). "The endosperm of Zea and Coix". American Journal of Botany. 17 (5): 371–380. doi:10.2307/2435927. JSTOR 2435927.
- "Presidential Address: The Indian as a Corn Breeder". Proceedings of the Indiana Academy of Science. 51: 13–21. 1941.
- "Early contacts of European science with the Indian corn plant". Proceedings of the Indiana Academy of Science. 54: 169–178. 1944.
- with Dorothy W. Sanders and Leland S. McClung: Sanders, Dorothy W.; Weatherwax, Paul; McClung, L. S. (June 1945). "Antibacterial substances from plants collected in Indiana". Journal of Bacteriology. 49 (6): 611–615. doi:10.1128/jb.49.6.611-615.1945. PMC 374094. PMID 16560960.
- "The first printed picture of Indian corn". Proceedings of the Indiana Academy of Science. 60: 273–275. 1950. (See De Historia Stirpium Commentarii Insignes.)

=== Books ===
- The Story of the Maize Plant. The University of Chicago science series. University of Chicago Press. 1923.
- Elementary Botany. 1942.
- Indian Corn in Old America. 1954.
