= Downright Dencey =

1927 children's book set after the war of 1812

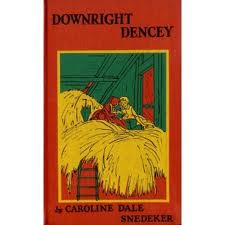
- Author: Caroline Snedeker
- Illustrator: Maginel Wright Barney
- Language: Englist
- Genre: Children's literature / History
- Publisher: Doubleday
- Publication date: 1927
- Publication place: United States
- Pages: 314
- ISBN: 1-883937-79-5
- OCLC: 317855938
- Followed by: The Beckoning Road

Downright Dencey is a 1927 children's historical novel written by Caroline Dale Snedeker and illustrated by Maginel Wright Barney. The novel is set in Nantucket, Massachusetts during the immediate aftermath of the War of 1812. A Quaker girl befriends a social outcast, Jetsam, after apologizing for hurting him. She tries to teach Jetsam to read and write, but she is grounded by her mother. She is only allowed to eat bread during her punishment. After Jetsam rescues her during a storm, he is adopted by her family. The two young people eventually change from best friends into a romantic couple. The book earned a Newbery Honor in 1928, Snedeker's first of two honors.

== Plot ==
The story is set in Nantucket, Massachusetts shortly after the War of 1812, and deals with the unlikely friendship between a Quaker girl, Dencey Coffyn, and Jetsam, the adopted son of the town drunk. Their friendship was formed when Dencey sought his forgiveness for hurting him with a stone. In exchange for his forgiveness, she taught him to read, and they grew closer, which was met with disapproval by her mother because Jetsam was a pariah who did not follow Quakerism.

However, Dencey refused to part ways with Jetsam, leading her mother to banish her to her room with only bread and water as punishment. Nevertheless, the friendship grew stronger to the point where Jetsam saved Dencey's life from a deadly storm. She was trapped in it while attempting to save him from accepting a job with the horrible Professor Snubshoe. Afterwards, he gained favor with Dencey's family, who adopted him and helped him to transform into an admirable young man. As Dencey and Jetsam grew closer and older, they developed romantic feelings for each other. Finally, Jetsam asked Dencey to marry him.

== Characters ==
- Dionis "Dencey" Cofyn - The heroine of the story. A girl who is viewed as a rebel, but in her rebellion, helps to change the life of a boy who was in need.
- Jetsam - The young man who was rejected and mistreated by society but accepted by Dencey.
- Lydia - Dencey's mother, a strong and devout woman who was worried about her daughter's morality.
- Captain Tom Cofyn - Dencey's father, who spent a lot of time away from his family while working at sea, but when he returned, he made his household happy.
- Hopestill - Dencey's cousin, who was pious and obedient.
- Peggy - The maid who helped to take care of the Cofyn's household.
- Injun Jill - Jetsam's adopted mother, who was an alcoholic and a beggar.
- Professor Snubshoe - The evil magician

== Sequel ==
A sequel, The Beckoning Road, was published in 1929. It follows the fortunes of Dencey's family as they move to Indiana and join the utopian community of New Harmony.
