= Fritz Lang filmography =

Fritz Lang (1890–1976) was an Austrian film director, producer and screenwriter. In his early career, Lang worked primarily as a screenwriter, finishing film scripts in four to five days. Lang directed major German films of the silent and early sound eras including Metropolis (1927) and M (1931) respectively. After fleeing from the Nazi regime, Lang directed some of the most important American crime and film noir motion pictures of the studio era, such as The Big Heat (1953). Lang appeared as himself in Jean-Luc Godard's Contempt (Le Mépris, 1963).

== Filmography ==
=== Films ===
Year	Film	Functioned as				Notes
Year	Film	Director	Producer	Writer	Actor	Notes
1919	Halbblut	Yes		Yes		silent lost film
1919	Master of Love	Yes			Yes	silent lost film
1919	The Spiders – Part 1: The Golden Sea	Yes		Yes		silent
1919	Harakiri	Yes				silent
1920	The Spiders – Part 2: The Diamond Ship	Yes		Yes		silent
1920	The Wandering Image	Yes		Yes		silent
1921	Four Around a Woman	Yes		Yes		silent
1921	Destiny	Yes		Yes		silent
1922	Dr. Mabuse, the Gambler – Part 1: The Great Gambler	Yes		Yes		silent
1922	Dr. Mabuse, the Gambler – Part 2: Inferno	Yes		Yes		silent
1924	Die Nibelungen – Part 1: Siegfried	Yes		Yes		silent
1924	Die Nibelungen – Part 2: Kriemhild's Revenge	Yes				silent
1927	Metropolis	Yes		Yes		silent
1928	Spies	Yes	Yes	Yes		silent
1929	Woman in the Moon	Yes	Yes			silent
1931	M	Yes				
1933	The Testament of Dr. Mabuse	Yes		Yes		
1934	Liliom	Yes		Yes		
1936	Fury	Yes		Yes		
1937	You Only Live Once	Yes				
1938	You and Me	Yes	Yes			
1940	The Return of Frank James	Yes				
1941	Western Union	Yes				
1941	Man Hunt	Yes				
1943	Hangmen Also Die!	Yes	Yes	Yes		
1944	Ministry of Fear	Yes				
1944	The Woman in the Window	Yes				
1945	Scarlet Street	Yes	Yes			
1946	Cloak and Dagger	Yes				
1947	Secret Beyond the Door	Yes	Yes			
1950	House by the River	Yes				
1950	American Guerrilla in the Philippines	Yes				
1952	Rancho Notorious	Yes				
1952	Clash by Night	Yes				
1953	The Blue Gardenia	Yes				
1953	The Big Heat	Yes				
1954	Human Desire	Yes				
1955	Moonfleet	Yes				
1956	While the City Sleeps	Yes				
1956	Beyond a Reasonable Doubt	Yes				
1959	The Tiger of Eschnapur	Yes		Yes		
1959	The Indian Tomb	Yes		Yes		
1960	The Thousand Eyes of Dr. Mabuse	Yes		Yes		

=== Contributions ===
Year	Film	Functioned as			Notes
Year	Film	Writer	Actor	Other	Notes
1916	Die Peitsche	Yes			Lost film. Uncertain if Lang was the script writer.
1917	Wedding in the Eccentric Club	Yes			
1917	Hilde Warren und der Tod	Yes			
1918	Lilith and Ly	Yes			
1919	Revenge Is Mine	Yes			
1919	Bettler GmbH	Yes			
1919	Wolkenbau und Flimmerstern	Yes			
1919	The Woman with Orchids	Yes			
1919	The Dance of Death	Yes			Lost film
1919	The Plague of Florence	Yes			
1920	The Mistress of the World	Yes			
1921	The Indian Tomb	Yes			
1942	Moontide			Yes	Lang left early in shooting, film direction is credited to Archie Mayo
1963	Contempt		Yes		Lang plays himself

== Bibliography ==
- "Fritz Lang > Filmography". Allmovie.
- McGilligan, Patrick (June 1997). Fritz Lang: the nature of the beast. St. Martin's Press. pp. 483–503. ISBN 0312194544.
- Eisner, Lotte H (1986). Fritz Lang. Da Capo Press. ISBN 0306802716.
- Grant, Barry Keith (2007). Film genre: from iconography to ideology. Wallflower Press. ISBN 9781904764793.
