= Piano Concerto (Yashiro) =

The Piano Concerto is the only piano concerto composed by the Japanese composer Akio Yashiro. The work was composed between 1964 and 1966 from a commission by NHK (the Japan Broadcasting Corporation) for National Art Performance of Ministry of Education, Science and Culture. He won 16th Otaka prize with this concerto. On July 10 and 11, 1967, the work was recorded for its premier broadcasting at NHK broadcasting centre and the recording was on air on November 5. This premier recording was performed by pianist Hiroko Nakamura accompanied by NHK Symphony Orchestra conducted by Hiroshi Wakasugi. The first public performance was on November 29, 3 weeks later from broadcasting, at the extra concert of NHK symphony orchestra with conductor Tadashi Mori and the same pianist.

This work requires two flutes, a piccolo, two oboes, two clarinets (second player also uses bass clarinet), two bassoons, four horns, two trumpets, three trombones, a tuba, timpani, a vibraphone, two percussionists (cymbal, tamtam, jingle bell, wood block and tubular bells), strings and piano solo.

== Structure ==
This work consists of three movements and takes just under half an hour in performance. While writing the work the composer kept in mind his predecessors' adage, "What a pianist has are not two hands, but ten fingers", which, he explained later, appears as highly demanding piano part throughout the concerto.

The first movement, allegro animato, composed between 1964 and the summer of 1966, is written in expanded sonata form with the first subject displayed by the solo piano at the beginning of the movement and the second subject distinguished by a prominent flute part. Several cadenzas of coloratura style, which Liszt also loved in his compositions, are inserted in the music. In contrast to the longer exposition compared to general sonata movements, the recapitulation is placed within. rather than after, the development.

Throughout the second movement, adagio misterioso, composed together with the third movement between 1966 and May 1967, the note C is played in ostinato rhythm, which the composer explained as a "recollection of dream in my younger days."

The third movement, a rondo, progresses as allegro - andante - vivace molto capriccioso. The music, recalling the melody of the first movement, varies rapidly until the end of the concerto.

== Sources ==
- 最新名曲解説全集10 協奏曲III（Ongaku-no-tomo publishing group）
- 矢代秋雄『オルフェオの死』, Ongaku-no-tomo, 1996
