= Horace Kenton Wright =

Bahamian artist and teacher

Horace Kenton Wright (February 21, 1915 – November 14, 1976) was a Bahamian artist and teacher, considered to be one of the "fathers of modern Bahamian art." He was known in particular for his watercolors.

== Early life ==
He was born in Chicago, Illinois, on February 21, 1915, to Jamaican parents Dr. Joseph and Maud Wright. At the age of two, his family relocated to the Bahamas.

== Education and career ==
In 1931, Wright began his career with the Bahamas Board of Education as a teacher. After travelling to London to pursue studies in art from 1948 to 1951, Wright became the Bahamas' only art teacher, serving from 1951 to 1960.

In a country with limited supplies and training, students were limited in their knowledge of art. During this period, Wright was able to "give Bahamian children an appreciation for art as a tool in industry, as well as a medium of personal expression."

In 1961, Wright was appointed Supervisor of Art for all schools in the Bahamas, and then served as Inspector of Schools from 1964 to 1967.

Wright received further training in Europe and Australia, which led to the final phase of his career in the field of education.

From 1967 to 1975, he served as Schools Broadcasting Officer and Senior Education Officer (Audio/Visual Aids).

== Legacy ==
Wright's taught some of the Bahamas' finest artistic talents, including James O. Rolle, Hervis Bain, and Stanley and Jackson Burnside.

Although Wright was never naturalised, he considered himself Bahamian and his extensive contribution to the education of Bahamian children is notable.

== Personal life ==
Wright married Cynthia Styles, also an educator. They were the parents of three sons. Wright died in Nassau, Bahamas, on November 14, 1976.

== See also ==
- List of Bahamian artists

== Bibliography ==
- Bahamian Legends, Volume I - 2004
- The Bahamas Handbook 1976-1977, Dupuch Publications.
