= Percy Leo Fowler =

New Zealand broadcaster, writer, radio producer and manager

Percy Leo Fowler (14 December 1902 – 3 November 1976) was a New Zealand broadcaster, writer, radio producer and manager. He was born in Litherland, Lancashire, England.
