= Vladimir Vranić =

Croatian mathematician (1896–1976)

- Born: 10 November 1896; Zagreb, Austria-Hungary, (now Croatia)
- Died: 3 August 1976 (aged 79); Zagreb, SFR Yugoslavia
- Education: University of Zagreb

Vladimir Vranić (November 10, 1896 – August 3, 1976) was a Croatian mathematician. He was one of the most renowned professors at the University of Zagreb. The amount of his scientific work was very large, and his most important work was in probability and statistics.

Vranić was Jewish, and during World War II, he was granted permission for freedom of residence and work by the "Directorate of the Ustaše Police" for the Jewish section.

== Bibliography ==
- Knežević, Snješka; Laslo, Aleksander (2011). Židovski Zagreb. Zagreb: AGM, Židovska općina Zagreb. ISBN 978-953-174-393-8.
- Kraus, Ognjen (1998). Dva stoljeća povijesti i kulture Židova u Zagrebu i Hrvatskoj. Zagreb: Židovska općina Zagreb. ISBN 953-96836-2-9.
