= Orders, decorations, and medals of the Commonwealth realms =

Awards

Orders of the Commonwealth realms

Awards are listed by order of wear.

== Antigua and Barbuda ==
- Order of the National Hero
- Order of the Nation
- Order of Merit
- Order of Princely Heritage

== Australia ==
- Order of Australia

== The Bahamas ==
- Order of the National Hero
- Order of the Nation
- Order of The Bahamas
- Order of Excellence
- Order of Distinction
- Order of Merit
- Order of Lignum Vitae

== Belize ==
- Order of the National Hero
- Order of Belize
- Order of Distinction

== Canada ==
- Order of Canada
- Order of Military Merit
- Order of Merit of the Police Forces

== Grenada ==
- Order of the National Hero
- Order of the Nation (Note: The Order of the Nation is a component order of knighthood within the Order of Grenada, rather than a fully separate order.)
- Order of Grenada

== Jamaica ==
- Order of the National Hero
- Order of the Nation
- Order of Excellence
- Order of Merit
- Order of Jamaica
- Order of Distinction

== New Zealand ==
- Order of New Zealand
- New Zealand Order of Merit
- King's Service Order

== Papua New Guinea ==
- Order of Logohu
- Order of the Star of Melanesia

== Saint Kitts and Nevis ==
- Order of St Christopher and Nevis
- Order of the National Hero

== Saint Lucia ==
- Order of Saint Lucia

== Solomon Islands ==
- Order of the Solomon Islands

== Tuvalu ==
- Tuvalu Order of Merit

== United Kingdom ==
- Order of the Garter
- Order of the Thistle
- Order of the Bath
- Order of Merit
- Order of St Michael and St George
- Royal Victorian Chain
- Royal Victorian Order
- Order of the British Empire
- Order of the Companions of Honour
- Distinguished Service Order
- Imperial Service Order

== See also ==
- Orders, decorations, and medals of Australia
  - Australian honours order of wearing
- Orders, decorations, and medals of Canada
  - Canadian honours order of wearing
- Orders, decorations, and medals of Jamaica
- Orders, decorations, and medals of New Zealand
  - New Zealand honours order of wearing
- Orders, decorations, and medals of Papua New Guinea
- Orders, decorations, and medals of the United Kingdom
  - United Kingdom Honours Order of Wearing
- List of post-nominal letters
- The Society of the Friends of St George's and Descendants of the Knights of the Garter
