= Cynthia A. Pratt =

Governor-General of the Bahamas since 2023

Her Excellency The Most Honourable Dame Cynthia Pratt ON GCMG CB CD JP
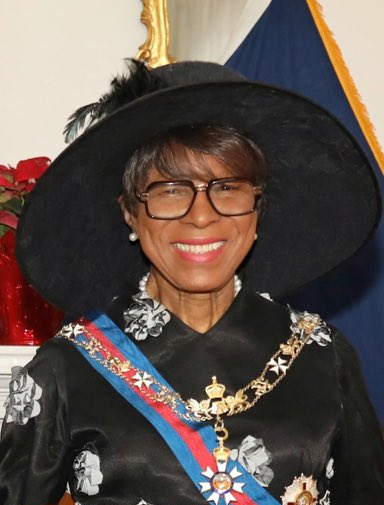
- Pratt in 2025

12th Governor-General of the Bahamas
- Incumbent
- Assumed office 1 September 2023
- Monarch: Charles III
- Prime Minister: Philip Davis
- Preceded by: Sir Cornelius A. Smith

Acting Prime Minister of the Bahamas
- In office 4 May 2005 – 22 June 2005
- Monarch: Elizabeth II
- Governor General: Dame Ivy Dumont
- Preceded by: Perry Christie
- Succeeded by: Perry Christie

Deputy Prime Minister of the Bahamas
- In office 3 May 2002 – 4 May 2007
- Prime Minister: Perry Christie
- Preceded by: Frank Watson
- Succeeded by: Brent Symonette

Member of Parliament for St. Cecilia
- In office 1997–2012

Personal details
- Born: Cynthia Alexandria Pratt; 5 November 1945 (age 80) New Providence, Bahamas
- Party: Progressive Liberal Party
- Spouse: Joseph B. Pratt (dec.)
- Children: 6
- Education: St. Augustine's University

Dame Cynthia Alexandria "Mother" Pratt ON GCMG CB CD JP (born 5 November 1945) is a Bahamian politician who has served as the 12th governor-general of the Bahamas since 2023.

== Early life and education ==
Cynthia Pratt was born on 5 November 1945 to Herman and Rose Moxey and received her early education at the Woodcock Primary School, the Western Junior and Senior Schools, A.F. Adderley and C.H. Reeves Schools. Pratt entered Princess Margaret Hospital Nursing School and graduated in 1963 as a trained nurse, where she spent fourteen years in the operating theatre. In 1978, Pratt was transferred to C.C. Sweeting Secondary School where she taught Physical Education, before leaving to study abroad in 1980.

During her studies at St. Augustine's College in Raleigh, North Carolina she served as the Softball Team Head Coach. She obtained a Bachelor of Science Degree in Health and Education with a minor in Sociology. In 1993, St. Augustine's College awarded her an Honorary Doctorate Degree of Humane Letters. For many years, she served as the President of the Bahamas Chapter of the St. Augustine's Alumni Association.

Cynthia Pratt led the Bahamas women's national softball team to a bronze medal at the 1981 World Games in Santa Clara, California. It was during these games that she was given the name "Mother" which today remains. Pratt was also a member of the National Basketball and Netball Teams.

After her graduation, Pratt returned to teaching at C.C. Sweeting Senior High School and later moved to Tertiary Education by becoming a part-time Lecturer and the Assistant Student Activities Director at the College of The Bahamas.

== Political career ==
After retiring from the College of The Bahamas, Pratt entered politics and became a Member of Parliament in 1997 representing the constituency of St. Cecilia. She served for 15 years as the Member of Parliament for the St. Cecilia constituency.

In 2002, following the victory of the Progressive Liberal Party in the national elections, Pratt became the first female Deputy Prime Minister of the Bahamas, a role she served till 2007. She served as acting Prime Minister in 2005 when PM Perry Christie suffered a stroke.

Pratt was also the first woman to serve as the Minister of National Security. She held the portfolio from 2002 to 2007.

== Governor-General ==
Pratt served as the deputy to the Governor-General of the Bahamas on several occasions.

In August 2023, Prime Minister Philip Davis announced that he had recommended to King Charles III that Pratt be appointed as the next Governor-General of the Bahamas. On 1 September 2023, Pratt was sworn in as the 12th Governor-General of the Bahamas during a ceremony at Government House. In her inaugural address as governor-general, Pratt said, "As a mother my eyes and ears are always open to the needs of our young people and the importance of doing all we can to uplift them so that as they grow into adulthood and inherit full responsibility for the continued development of our nation".

== Personal life ==
Pratt was married to Joseph B. Pratt until his death. They had six children (including a deceased adopted son).

On 10 November 2017, Pratt launched her biography, An Ordinary Woman from the Heart of the Inner City, published by Scholar Books. Publisher Albert Cox reported at the launch that 35,000 copies had been sold already. Vernon Lynch, brother of actor Eddie Murphy, said he would make Pratt's book into a movie.

Pratt is an ordained Minister of the Gospel.

== Honours ==
In 2018, Pratt was appointed as a Companion of the Order of Distinction (CD). In the 2023 Independence Honours, Pratt was appointed as a Companion of the Order of the Bahamas (CB).

Upon taking office as governor-general, Pratt was conferred with the Order of the Nation (ON), and was sworn in as chancellor of the National Honours Society of The Bahamas.

She was appointed Dame Grand Cross of the Order of St Michael and St George (GCMG) in February 2024.

Political offices
Preceded by Frank Watson	Deputy Prime Minister of the Bahamas; 2002–2007	Succeeded by Brent Symonette
Preceded by Perry Christie	Prime Minister of the Bahamas; Acting; 2005	Succeeded by Perry Christie
Government offices
Preceded by Sir Cornelius A. Smith	Governor-General of the Bahamas; 2023–present	Incumbent
