= Winston Saunders =

Bahamian lawyer and writer (1941–2006)

Winston Saunders CMG
- Born: Winston Vernon Saunders; 3 October 1941
- Died: 25 November 2006 (aged 65); Jamaica
- Education: Government High School; University of London
- Occupations: Educator, lawyer, actor and playwright
- Spouse: Diane Gail North (m. 1968)

Winston Vernon Saunders, CMG (3 October 1941 – 25 November 2006) was a Bahamian educator, lawyer, actor, playwright and cultural director.

== Early life and education ==
In his youth, Saunders attended Government High School in Nassau, Bahamas, later becoming head boy there. Having attended the Bahamas Teachers' College, he obtained a Bachelor of Arts degree (BA) in Classics from the University of London in 1964. He taught English at St Anne's High School in Nassau from 1964 until 1968.

In April 1968, Saunders married Diane Gail North. In the fall of that year, he returned to London to obtain a postgraduate certificate in education at the University of London.

== Career ==
Saunders served as vice-principal of RM Bailey Senior High School from 1969 to 1970. In 1970, he joined a law firm as an articled clerk. Saunders was called to the Bahamas Bar in 1974, and later became a partner in the prestigious Bahamian law firm of McKinney, Bancroft and Hughes.

An actor, playwright, director and producer, Saunders assumed the position of chairman of the Dundas Centre for the Performing Arts from 1975 to 1998.

Saunders was the author of two notable Bahamian plays – Them and You Can Lead A Horse To Water – as well as the Nehemiah Quartet series. Saunders founded the Bahamas National Youth Choir, National Dance Company, National Children's Choir. He was also a driving force behind the modern Dundas Centre for the Performing Arts.

Saunders was Her Majesty's Coroner for the Bahamas from 1993 and 2000.

== Awards and honours ==
Saunders won a number of awards including, DANSAs for playwriting, the Meta, a special DANSA for Excellence in Theatre, the Chamber of Commerce Distinguished Citizen Award for contribution to Culture and the Silver Jubilee Award for Culture.

In 2004, Saunders was appointed a Companion of the Order of St Michael and St George (CMG).

== Death ==
Saunders died aged 65 on 25 November 2006 in Jamaica, where, in his role as chairman of the Bahamas' National Commission on Cultural Development, he was assisting in discussions to plan the commemoration of the 200th anniversary of the abolition of the slave trade in the British Empire.

Saunders was survived by his wife Gail Saunders, OBE, the director-general of Heritage in the Bahamas.
