= Gail Saunders =

Bahamian historian, archivist (1944–2023)

Gail Saunders OBE
- Born: Diane Gail North; March 10, 1944
- Died: October 30, 2023 (aged 79); New Providence, The Bahamas
- Education: University of Newcastle upon Tyne; University of Leicester; University College London; University of Waterloo
- Occupations: Historian, archivist, educator and author
- Spouse: Winston Saunders (m. 1968)

Gail Saunders OBE or Diane Gail North Saunders (March 10, 1944 – June 30, 2023) was a prominent Bahamian historian, archivist, author and athlete.

She established the Bahamian National Archives and was the director from 1971 until 2004. She was the president of the Bahamas Historical Society from 1989 until 1999. Saunders was president of the Association of Caribbean Historians, president of the Caribbean Archives Association, and an executive member of the International Council on Archives. She authored books about Bahamian history including Historic Bahamas, Islanders in the Stream: A History of the Bahamian People, and Race and Class in the Colonial Bahamas, 1880-1960. Saunders was also one of the four women who first represented the Bahamas in an international sports competition as a member of the sprint relay team at the 1962 Central American and Caribbean Games. She was made an ordinary officer of the Order of the British Empire (OBE) in 2003, inducted into the Bahamas National Sports Hall of Fame in 2013, and appointed as a member of the national Order of Distinction in 2019.

== Early life and education ==
Diane Gail North was born to Edward Basil and Audrey Virginia (Isaacs) North on March 10, 1944. North earned a Bachelor of Arts degree in history in 1966 from University of Newcastle upon Tyne and a postgraduate certificate in Education from the University of Leicester in 1967. Saunders also studied under historian Michael Craton at the University of Waterloo to earn a doctorate.

== Athletics ==
During her high school and college years, North was a superior scholar and athlete. North represented the country on the sprint relay team at the 1962 Central American and Caribbean Games, in Kingston, Jamaica. At the event, along with Althea Rolle-Clarke, Elaine Thompson, and Christina Jones-Darville, she was one of the four women to first represent the Bahamas in an international sports competition.

== Career ==
North taught history at Government High School for two years. In 1968, she married Winston Saunders and the couple moved to England for further schooling.

Saunders studied at University College London and worked at the British Council in the Public Record Offices to study the process for archiving. When the couple moved back to the Bahamas in 1969, she took a position at the library in the Ministry of Education, where she organised the records of the old Board of Education to make the first deposit in the National Archives.

The Ministry of Education asked Saunders to establish the Bahamian National Archives. The archives were held at the Eastern Public Library (the Eastern Post Office) for 16 years. Saunders was the director from 1971 until 2004 and director-general of the archives until her retirement in 2008.

Saunders was also president of the Association of Caribbean Historians, president of the Caribbean Archives Association, and an executive member of the International Council on Archives.

Saunders authored books about Bahamian history, including Historic Bahamas, Islanders in the Stream: A History of the Bahamian People (Volumes 1 and 2) with Michael Craton, and Race and Class in the Colonial Bahamas, 1880–1960.

After retirement from the National Archives, Saunders remained active in academic pursuits as a scholar-in-residence at the College of the Bahamas.

== Later life and death ==
Saunders died at her home in western New Providence on 30 June 2023, at the age of 79. She was predeceased by her husband, who died in 2006. A state-recognised funeral was held for her on Friday 21 July 2023 at Christ Church Cathedral, Nassau. The Tribune, one of two Nassau daily newspapers, noted on her passing:

History was important to Dr Gail Saunders. And Dr Gail Saunders was important to our history.... Dr Saunders did not just record what happened in our nation’s history but examined what it meant, and fundamentally helped to define our understanding of race and class in the Bahamas. Her passing comes as we approach a landmark in history – 50 years as an independent nation....May those who follow her live up to the impact she has made on the Bahamas – and may she rest in peace.

== Awards and honours ==
Saunders was made an ordinary officer of the Order of the British Empire (OBE) in 2003. The University of the West Indies awarded her an honorary degree in 2004. Saunders was also inducted into the Bahamas National Sports Hall of Fame in 2013.

In the 2019 National Honours, she was appointed as a Member of the Order of Distinction for her exemplary service to the Bahamas.

In her will, Saunders left $200k to the University of the Bahamas. The university established the D. Gail Saunders Memorial Endowment Fund for history scholarships with half of the funds. The other half would boost an endowment established in honour of her husband (a former lawyer, teacher, and playwright) to fund scholarships for English majors.

== Works ==
This is an incomplete list of the works of Dr. Gail Saunders (please help to complete it):

- Historic Bahamas
- Islanders in the Stream: A History of the Bahamian People (Volumes 1 and 2) with Michael Craton
- Race and Class in the Colonial Bahamas, 1880–1960.
