= Order of St Michael and St George =

British order of chivalry established in 1818

Most Distinguished Order of Saint Michael and Saint George
- Seal of the Order

Awarded by the Monarch of the Commonwealth Realms
- Type: Order of chivalry
- Established: 28 April 1818
- Motto: Auspicium Melioris Ævi (Latin for 'Token of a Better Age')
- Eligibility: Typically Commonwealth realm citizens
- Awarded for: At the monarch's pleasure, though typically bestowed for extraordinary non-military service in a foreign country or for services to foreign and Commonwealth affairs
- Status: Currently constituted
- Founder: Prince George, Prince Regent
- Sovereign: Charles III
- Grand Master: Prince Edward, Duke of Kent
- Grades: Knight/Dame Grand Cross (GCMG); Knight/Dame Commander (KCMG/DCMG); Companion (CMG)

Precedence
- Next (higher): Order of the Star of India
- Next (lower): Order of the Indian Empire
- Ribbon bar of the Order

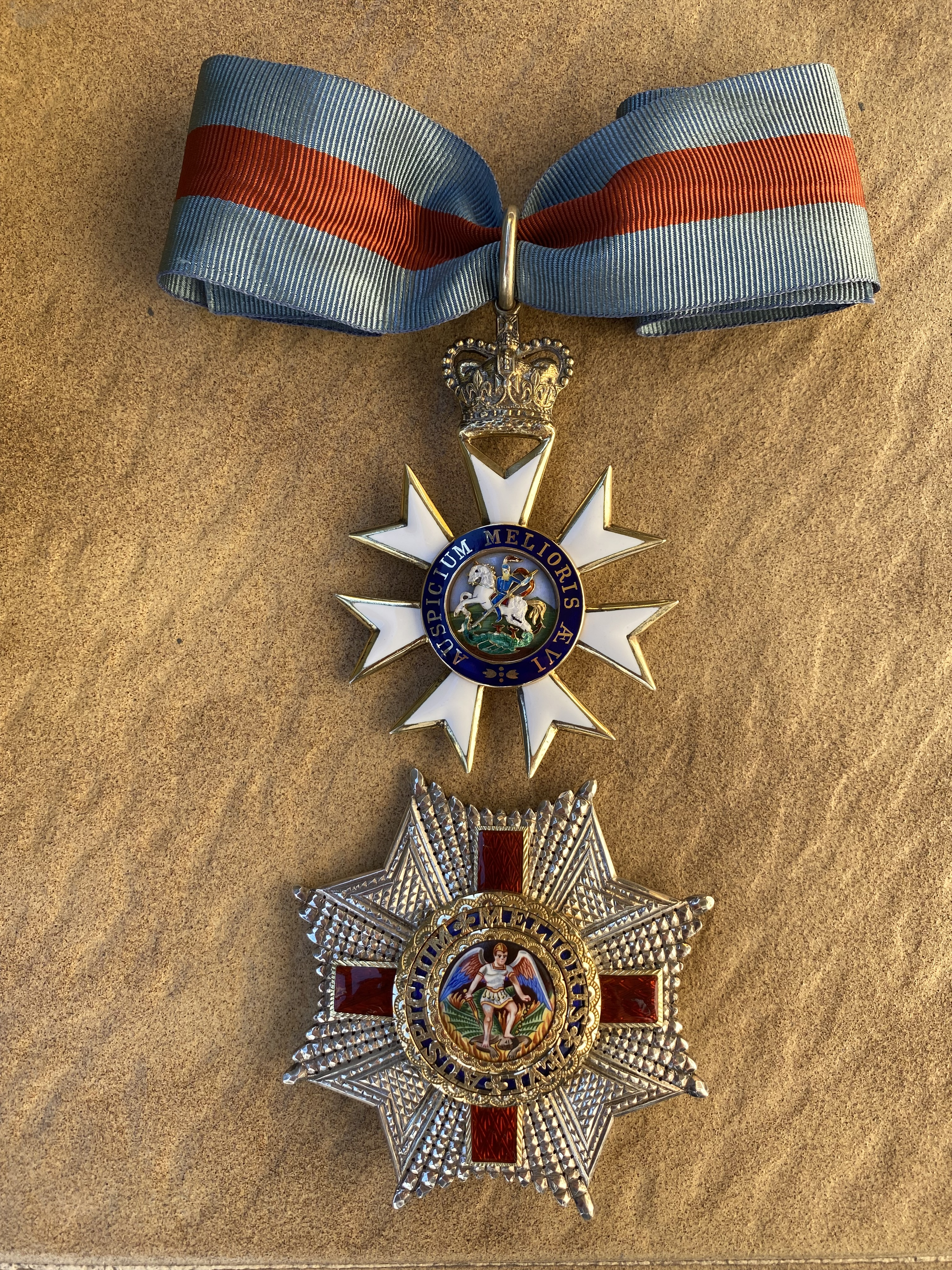
Knight Commander, KCMG insignia

The Most Distinguished Order of Saint Michael and Saint George is a British order of chivalry founded on 28 April 1818 by George, Prince of Wales (the future King George IV), while he was acting as prince regent for his father, King George III. It is named in honour of two military saints, Michael and George.

The Order of St Michael and St George was originally bestowed on those holding commands or high position in the Mediterranean territories acquired in the Napoleonic Wars, and it was subsequently extended to holders of similar office or position in other territories of the British Empire. It is at present bestowed on men and women who hold high office or who render extraordinary or important non-military service to the United Kingdom in a foreign country, and it can also be conferred for important or loyal service in relation to foreign and Commonwealth affairs.

Appointments are announced in The Gazette.

== Description ==
The three classes of appointment to the Order are, from highest grade to lowest grade:

1. Knight Grand Cross or Dame Grand Cross of the Most Distinguished Order of St Michael and St George (GCMG) (Note: It is commonly written without "of the Most Distinguished Order" and other words not implied by the post-nominals.)
2. Knight Commander or Dame Commander of the Most Distinguished Order of St Michael and St George (KCMG or DCMG)
3. Companion of the Most Distinguished Order of St Michael and St George (CMG)

Classes of the Most Distinguished Order of St Michael and St George
Grade	Knight Grand Cross	Dame Grand Cross	Knight Commander	Dame Commander	Companion
Prefix	Sir	Dame	Sir	Dame	—
Post-nominals	GCMG		KCMG	DCMG	CMG
Insignia	Heraldic collar of the Order of St Michael and St George				

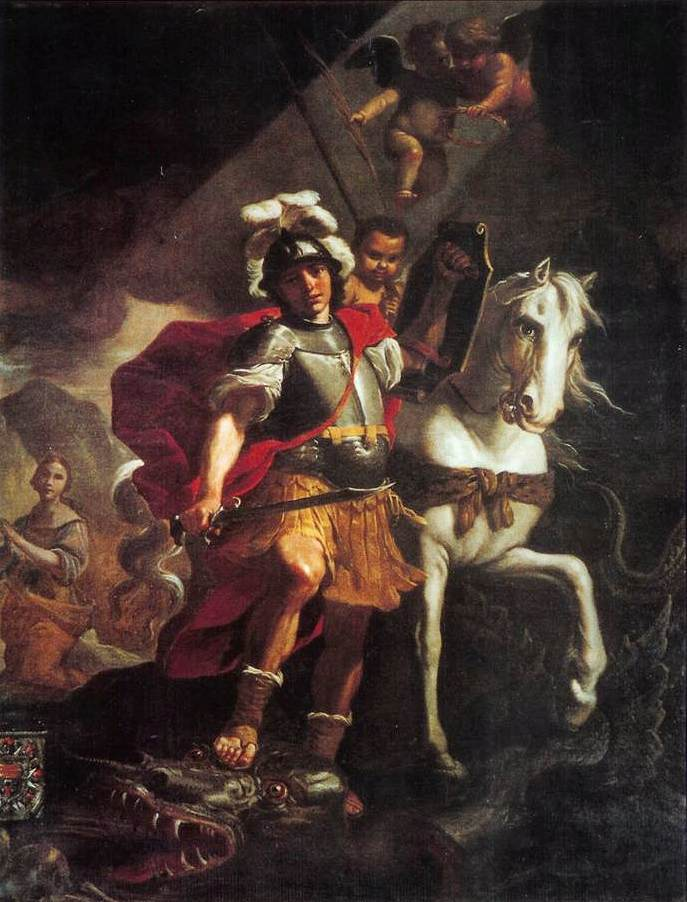
St George and the Dragon by Mattia Preti (1678)

Coat of arms of the British monarch as sovereign of the Order of St Michael and St George

It is used to honour individuals who have rendered important services in relation to Commonwealth or foreign nations. People are appointed to the Order rather than awarded it. British Ambassadors to foreign nations are regularly appointed KCMGs, DCMGs or CMGs. For example, the former British Ambassador to the United States Sir David Manning was appointed Companion (CMG) when he worked for the British Foreign and Commonwealth Office (FCO), and then, after his appointment as British Ambassador to the US, he was promoted to Knight Commander (KCMG). It is the traditional order for members of the FCO.

The Order's motto is Auspicium melioris ævi (Latin for "Token of a better age"). Its patron saints, as the name suggests, are St. Michael the Archangel and St. George, patron saint of England and of soldiers. One of its primary symbols is that of St Michael trampling over and subduing Satan in battle.

The Order is the sixth-most senior in the British honours system, after the Most Noble Order of the Garter, the Most Ancient and Most Noble Order of the Thistle, the Most Illustrious Order of St Patrick, the Most Honourable Order of the Bath and the Most Exalted Order of the Star of India. The third of the aforementioned orders—which relates to Ireland, no longer fully a part of the United Kingdom—still exists but is in disuse; no appointments have been made to it since 1936. The last of the orders on the list, related to India, has also been in disuse since that country's independence in 1947.

== History ==
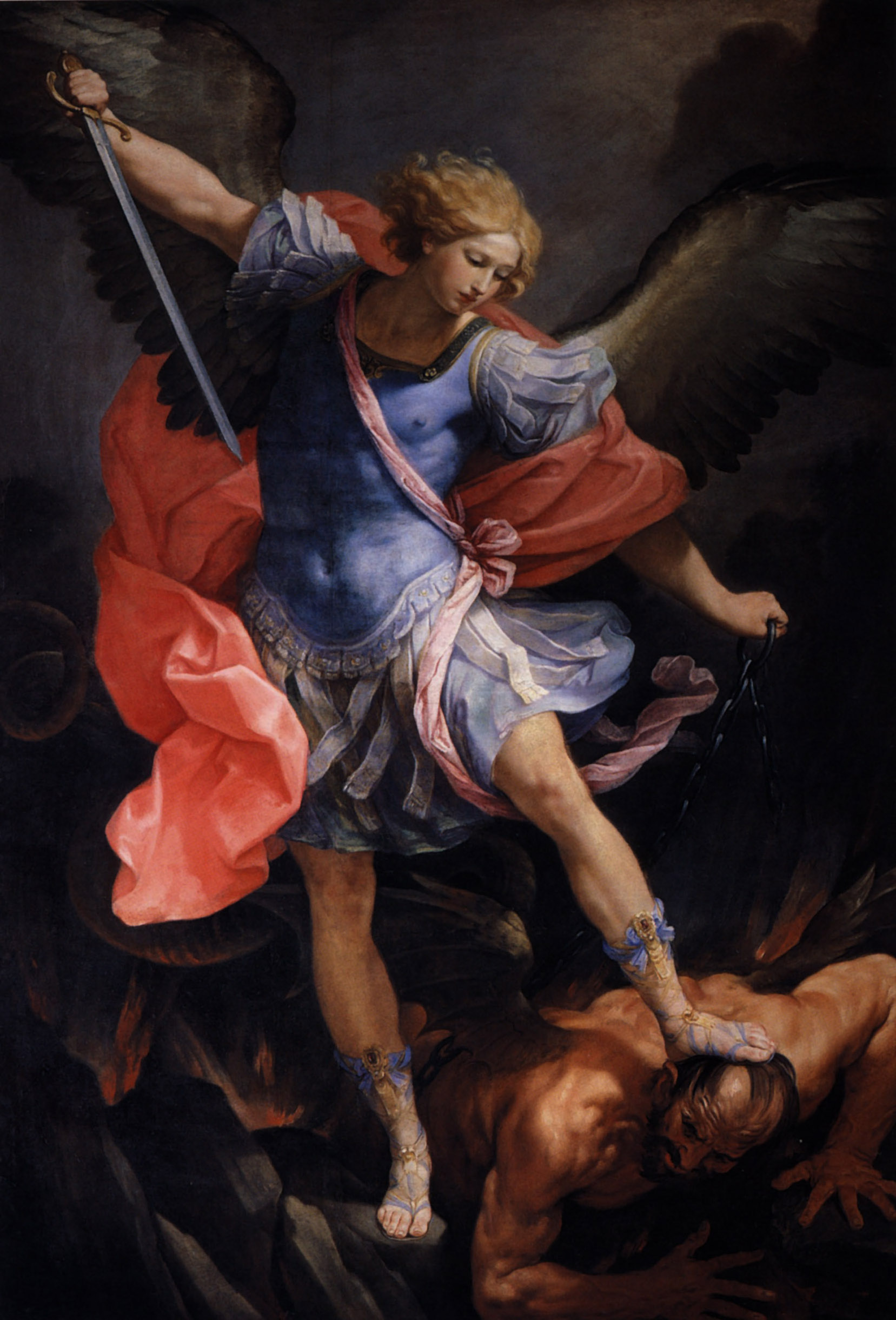
The Order's insignia often depict St Michael subduing Satan

The Prince Regent founded the Order to commemorate the British amical protectorate over the Ionian Islands, which had come under British control in 1814 and had been granted their own constitution as the United States of the Ionian Islands in 1817. It was intended to reward "natives of the Ionian Islands and of the island of Malta and its dependencies, and for such other subjects of His Majesty as may hold high and confidential situations in the Mediterranean".

In 1864, however, the protectorate ended and the Ionian Islands became part of Greece. A revision of the basis of the Order in 1868, saw membership granted to those who "hold high and confidential offices within Her Majesty's colonial possessions, and in reward for services rendered to the Crown in relation to the foreign affairs of the Empire". Accordingly, nowadays, almost all Governors-General and Governors feature as recipients of appointments in the order, typically as Knights and Dames Grand Cross.

In 1965, the order was opened to women, with Evelyn Bark becoming the first female CMG in 1967.

== Composition ==
The British sovereign is the Sovereign of the Order and appoints all other members of the Order (by convention, on the advice of the Government).

=== Grand Master ===
The next-most senior member is the Grand Master. The office was formerly filled by the Lord High Commissioner of the Ionian Islands; now, however, Grand Masters are chosen by the Sovereign. Grand Masters include:

- 1818–1824: Sir Thomas Maitland (Sovereigns: King George III and King George IV)
- 1825–1850: Prince Adolphus, Duke of Cambridge (Sovereigns: King George IV, King William IV, Queen Victoria)
- 1850–1904: Prince George, Duke of Cambridge (Sovereigns: Queen Victoria and King Edward VII)
- 1905–1910: George, Prince of Wales (Sovereign: King Edward VII)
- 1910–1917: None. In 1910, the Prince of Wales ceased to be Grand Master when he acceded to the throne as King George V and became Sovereign himself
- 1917–1936: Edward, Prince of Wales (Sovereign: King George V)
- 1936–1957: Alexander Cambridge, 1st Earl of Athlone (Sovereigns: King Edward VIII, King George VI, Queen Elizabeth II)
- 1957–1959: Edward Wood, 1st Earl of Halifax (Sovereign: Queen Elizabeth II)
- 1959–1967: Harold Alexander, 1st Earl Alexander of Tunis (Sovereign: Queen Elizabeth II)
- 1967–present: Prince Edward, Duke of Kent (Sovereigns: Queen Elizabeth II, King Charles III)

The Order originally included 15 Knights Grand Cross, 20 Knights Commander and 25 Companions, but has since been expanded and the current limits on membership are 125, 375 and 1,750, respectively. Members of the royal family who are appointed to the Order do not count towards the limit, nor do foreign members appointed as "honorary members". The register of the order states that as of 11 July 2025 there were 71, 224 and 935 members of the highest, middle and lowest grades, respectively.

=== Officers ===
The Order has six officers. The Order's King of Arms is not a member of the College of Arms, like many other heraldic officers. The Usher of the Order is known as the Gentleman or Lady Usher of the Blue Rod. Blue Rod does not, unlike the usher of the Order of the Garter, perform any duties related to the House of Lords.

== Habit and insignia ==
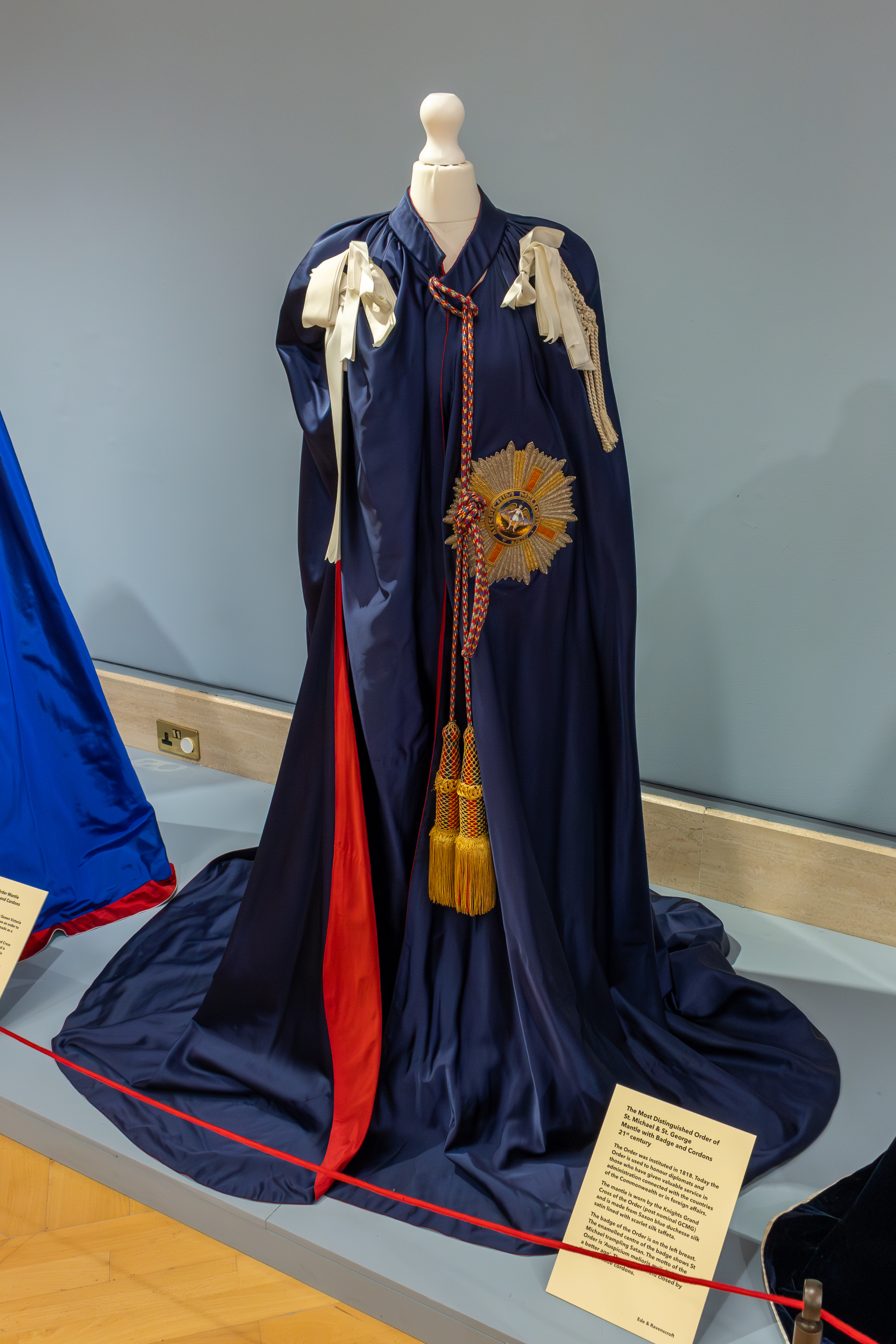
Mantle of the Order

Representation of the star of a Knight or Dame Grand Cross

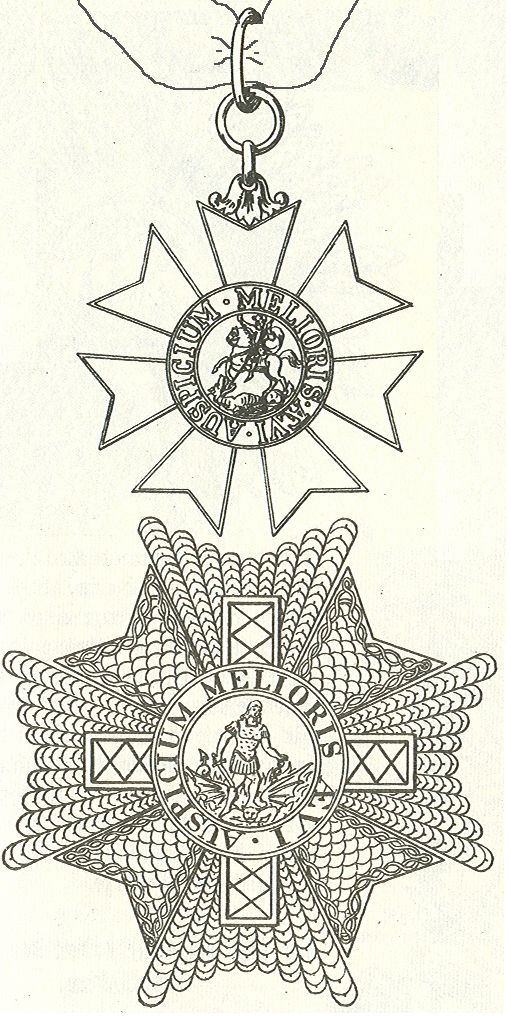
Star and badge of a Knight or Dame Commander

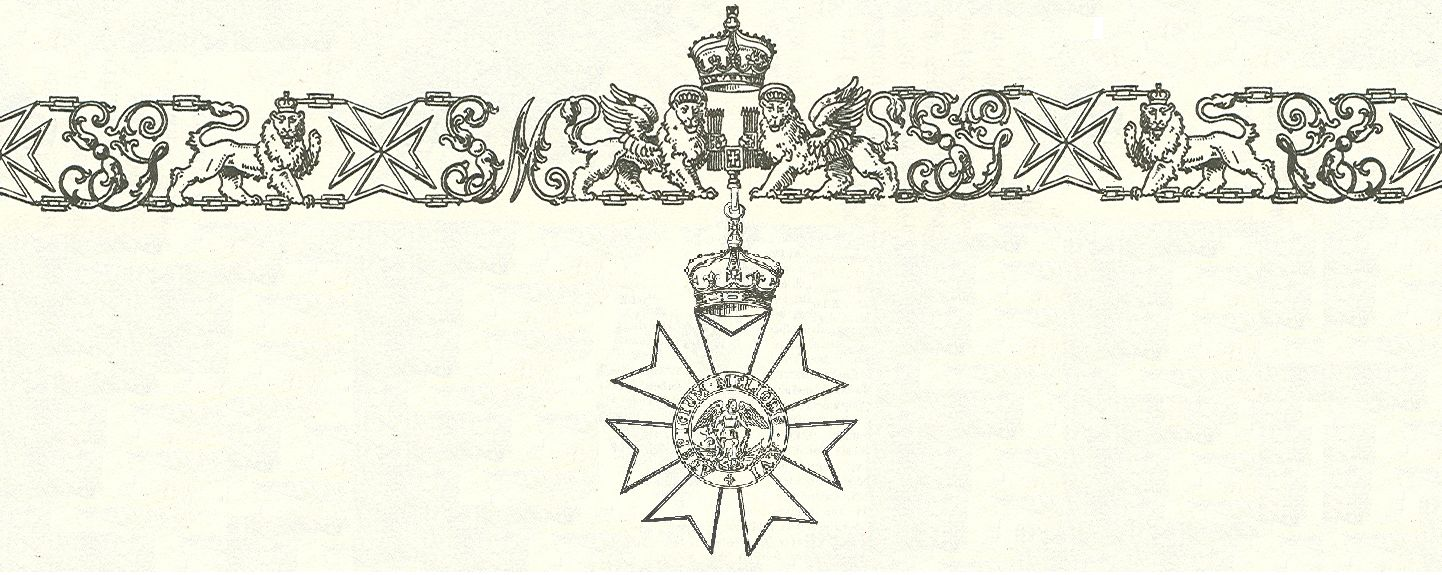
Collar worn by a Knight or Dame Grand Cross

Members of the Order wear elaborate regalia on important occasions (such as coronations), which vary by rank:

- The mantle, worn only by Knights and Dames Grand Cross, is made of Saxon blue satin lined with crimson silk. On the left side is a representation of the star (see below). The mantle is bound with two large tassels.
- The collar, worn only by Knights and Dames Grand Cross, is made of gold. It consists of depictions of crowned English lions, Maltese Crosses, and the cyphers "SM" and "SG", all alternately. In the centre are two winged lions of St. Mark, each holding a bible and seven arrows—the emblem of the seven united Ionian Islands.

At less important occasions, simpler insignia are used:

- The star is an insignia used only by Knights and Dames Grand Cross and Knights and Dames Commander. It is worn pinned to the left breast. The Knight and Dame Grand Cross' star includes seven-armed, silver-rayed 'Maltese Asterisk' (for want of a better description—see image of badge), with a gold ray in between each pair of arms. The Knight and Dame Commander's star is a slightly smaller eight-pointed silver figure formed by two Maltese Crosses; it does not include any gold rays. In each case, the star bears a red cross of St George. In the centre of the star is a dark blue ring bearing the motto of the Order. Within the ring is a representation of St Michael trampling on Satan.
- The badge is the only insignia used by all members of the Order; it is suspended on a blue-crimson-blue ribbon. Knights and Dames Grand Cross wear it on a riband or sash, passing from the right shoulder to the left hip. Knights Commander and male Companions wear the badge from a ribbon around the neck; Dames Commander and female Companions wear it from a bow on the left shoulder. The badge is a seven-armed, white-enamelled "Maltese Asterisk" (see Maltese Cross); the obverse shows St Michael trampling on Satan, while the reverse shows St George on horseback killing a dragon, both within a dark blue ring bearing the motto of the Order.

Prior to 2011, the devil was portrayed with black skin while St Michael was shown as being white; this was changed that year to show both with same skin colour, although St Michael's wings were changed from being multi-colour to being pure white. The alleged racism of this imagery has resulted in the government of Jamaica suspending the use of the badge entirely. In June 2020, calls were made for a complete redesign of the insignia, including from Sir Michael Palin of Monty Python fame, a Knight Commander of the Order. In July 2020, the Cabinet Office announced that officers of the Order who were unhappy with their insignia could exchange them for one of the newer models.

On certain collar days designated by the Sovereign, members attending formal events may wear the Order's collar over their military uniform or morning wear. When collars are worn (either on collar days or on formal occasions such as coronations), the badge is suspended from the collar. All collars which have been issued since 1948 must be returned to the Central Chancery of the Orders of Knighthood. The other insignia may be retained.

== Chapel ==
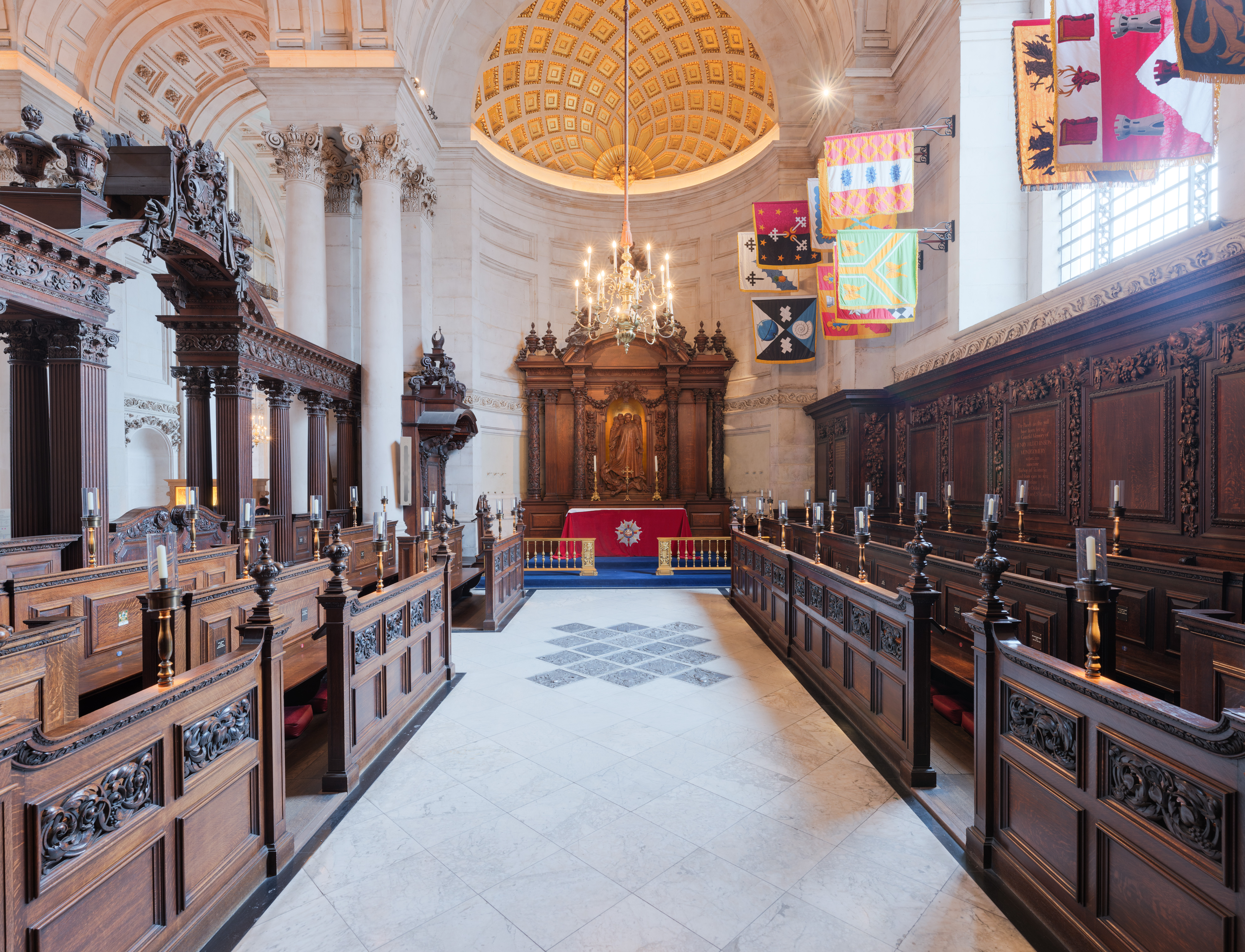
The chapel of the Order of St Michael and St George in St Paul's Cathedral, London

The original home of the Order was the Palace of St. Michael and St. George in Corfu, the residence of the Lord High Commissioner of the Ionian Islands and the seat of the Ionian Senate. Since 1906, the Order's chapel has been in St Paul's Cathedral in London. (The Cathedral also serves as home to the chapels of the Order of the British Empire and the Imperial Society of Knights Bachelor.) Religious services for the whole Order are held quadrennially; new Dames and Knights Grand Cross are installed at these services.

The Sovereign and the Knights and Dames Grand Cross are allotted stalls in the choir of the chapel, above which their heraldic devices are displayed. Perched on the pinnacle of a knight's stall is his helm, decorated with a mantling and topped by his crest. Under English heraldic law, women other than monarchs do not bear helms or crests; instead, the coronet appropriate to the dame's rank, if there is one, is used. Above the crest or coronet, the stall's occupant's heraldic banner is hung, emblazoned with his or her coat of arms. At a considerably smaller scale, to the back of the stall is affixed a piece of brass (a "stall plate") displaying its occupant's name, arms and date of admission into the Order. Upon the death of a Knight, the banner, helm, mantling and crest are taken down. The stall plates, however, are not removed; rather, they remain permanently affixed somewhere about the stall, so that the stalls of the chapel are festooned with a colourful record of the Order's Knights and Dames Grand Cross since 1906.

The reredos within the chapel was commissioned from Henry Poole in 1927.

== Precedence and privileges ==
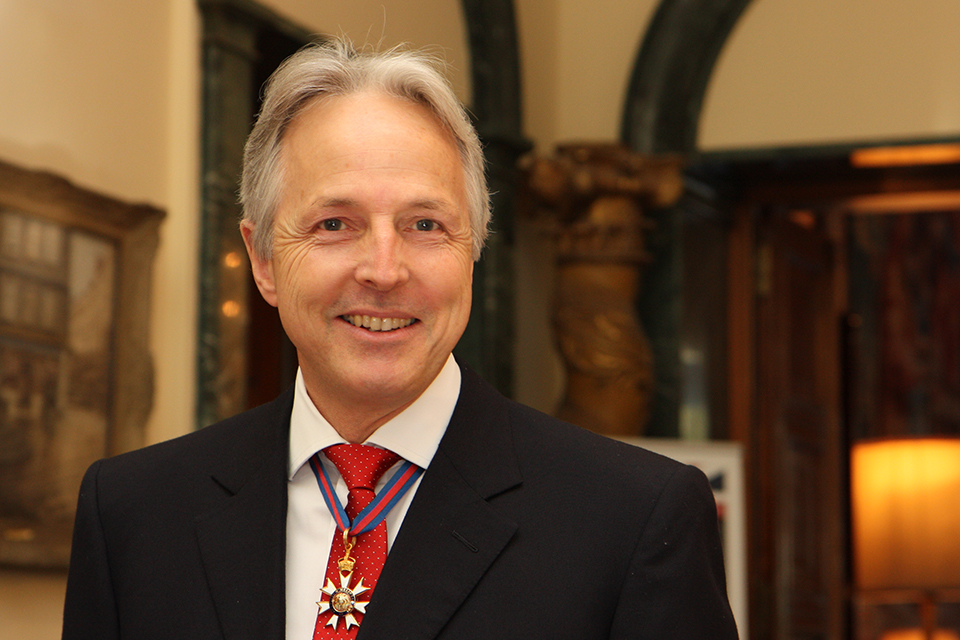
Christopher Prentice wearing the insignia of a Companion of the Order of Saint Michael and St George

Members of the Order of St Michael are assigned positions in the order of precedence in England and Wales. Wives of male members also feature on the order of precedence, as do sons, daughters and daughters-in-law of Knights Grand Cross and Knights Commander; relatives of female members, however, are not assigned any special precedence. (Individuals can derive precedence from their fathers or husbands, but not from their mothers or wives. This follows the general rule of honours, that a husband never derives any style or title from his wife.)

Knights Grand Cross and Knights Commander prefix "Sir", and Dames Grand Cross and Dames Commander prefix "Dame", to their forenames. Wives of Knights may prefix "Lady" to their surnames, but husbands of Dames derive no title from their wives. Such forms are not used by peers and princes, except when the names of the former are written out in their fullest forms. Furthermore, honorary (foreign) members and clergymen do not receive the accolade and thus are not entitled to use the prefix "Sir" or "Dame". Knights and Dames Grand Cross use the post-nominal "GCMG"; Knights Commander and Dames Commander use "KCMG" and "DCMG", respectively; Companions use "CMG".

Knights and Dames Grand Cross are also entitled to receive heraldic supporters. They may, furthermore, encircle their arms with a depiction of the circlet (a circle bearing the motto) and the collar; the former is shown either outside or on top of the latter. Knights and Dames Commander and Companions may display the circlet, but not the collar, surrounding their arms. The badge is depicted suspended from the collar or circlet.

== Popular references ==
In the satirical British television programme Yes Minister, Jim Hacker MP is told a joke by his Private Secretary, Bernard Woolley, about what the various post-nominals stand for. From Series 2, Episode 2 "Doing the Honours":

Woolley: In the service, CMG stands for "Call Me God". And KCMG for "Kindly Call Me God".
Hacker: What does GCMG stand for?
Woolley (deadpan): "God Calls Me God".

Ian Fleming's spy, James Bond, a commander in the Royal Navy Volunteer Reserve (RNVR), was fictionally decorated as a CMG in 1953. This is mentioned in the novels From Russia, with Love and On Her Majesty's Secret Service, and on-screen in his obituary in Skyfall. He was offered appointment as KCMG (which would have elevated him from Companion to Knight Commander in the Order) in The Man with the Golden Gun, but he rejected the offer as he did not wish to become a public figure. Judi Dench's character "M" is "offered" early retirement as a GCMG in Skyfall.

Daniel Craig, who has portrayed Bond on film, was appointed (CMG) in the 2022 New Year Honours for services to film and theatre. The general release on 30 September 2021 of his last appearance as James Bond, in No Time to Die, had been delayed by almost two years due to a change of director and the COVID-19 pandemic. Coinciding with the film's premiere, and matching his fictional character's rank, Craig became an Honorary Commander in Britain's Royal Navy. Following this appointment, he committed to being an ambassador for the Royal Navy, particularly in its international role, and to the welfare of its service families.

Long-time Doctor Who companion Brigadier Lethbridge-Stewart wore the ribbon of the order as the highest of his decorations.

== Current Knights and Dames Grand Cross ==
=== Sovereign and Grand Master ===
Name	Year of appointment	Present age
King Charles III (ex officio)	Sovereign since 2022	77
Prince Edward, Duke of Kent KG, GCMG, GCVO, CD, ADC	1967	91

=== Knights and Dames Grand Cross ===
Name	Known for	Year of appointment	Present age
David Wilson, Baron Wilson of Tillyorn KT, GCMG, FRSE	Governor of Hong Kong	1991	91
Sir Wiwa Korowi GCMG	Governor-General of Papua New Guinea	1992	78
Sir James Carlisle GCMG, KStJ	Governor-General of Antigua and Barbuda	1993	94
Sir Rodric Braithwaite GCMG	Chairman of the UK Joint Intelligence Committee and Ambassador to the Soviet Union and Russia	1994	94
Sir Colville Young GCMG, MBE, PC	Governor-General of Belize	1994	93
David Hannay, Baron Hannay of Chiswick GCMG, CH	Permanent Representative to the United Nations	1995	91
Sir Orville Turnquest ON, GCMG, KC, JP	Governor-General of The Bahamas	1995	97
Sir Tulaga Manuella GCMG, MBE	Governor-General of Tuvalu	1996	90
Sir John Coles GCMG	Permanent Under-Secretary of State for Foreign Affairs	1997	88
Dame Pearlette Louisy GCSL, GCMG, DStJ	Governor-General of Saint Lucia	1999	80
Sir Andrew Wood GCMG	Ambassador to Russia and Ambassador to Yugoslavia	2001	86
Sir John Goulden GCMG	Permanent Representative to the Western European Union, Permanent Representative to the North Atlantic Council and Ambassador to Turkey	2001	85
John Kerr, Baron Kerr of Kinlochard GCMG	Permanent Under-Secretary of State of the Foreign and Commonwealth Office and Ambassador to the United States	2001	84
Sir Tomasi Puapua GCMG, KBE, PC	Governor-General of Tuvalu and Prime Minister of Tuvalu	2002	88
Sir David Wright GCMG, LVO	Ambassador to Japan and Ambassador to South Korea	2002	82
Sir Jeremy Greenstock GCMG	Permanent Representative of the United Kingdom to the United Nations	2003	83
Sir Rob Young GCMG	High Commissioner to India	2003	81
George Robertson, Baron Robertson of Port Ellen KT, GCMG, PC, FRSA, FRSE	Secretary General of NATO	2004	80
Sir Stephen Wall GCMG, LVO	Permanent Representative to the European Union and Ambassador to Portugal	2004	79
Michael Jay, Baron Jay of Ewelme GCMG	Permanent Under-Secretary of State of the Foreign and Commonwealth Office and Ambassador to France	2006	80
Sir Emyr Jones Parry GCMG, FInstP, FLSW	Permanent Representative to the United Nations Security Council and Permanent Representative to NATO	2007	79
Sir Kenneth Hall ON, GCMG, OJ	Governor-General of Jamaica	2007	85
Dame Louise Lake-Tack GCMG, DStJ, DGN, DNH, GCH, OM	Governor-General of Antigua and Barbuda	2007	82
Sir David Manning GCMG, KCVO	Ambassador to the United States, Permanent Representative on the North Atlantic Council and Ambassador to Israel	2008	76
Sir Patrick Allen ON, GCMG, KStJ, CD	Governor-General of Jamaica	2009	75
Sir Frank Kabui GCMG, OBE, KStJ CSI	Governor-General of the Solomon Islands	2009	80
Sir Arthur Foulkes ON, GCMG	Governor-General of The Bahamas and High Commissioner to the United Kingdom	2010	98
Sir Iakoba Italeli GCMG	Governor-General of Tuvalu and Attorney General of Tuvalu	2010	
Peter Ricketts, Baron Ricketts GCMG, GCVO	National Security Adviser and Permanent Under-Secretary of State of the Foreign and Commonwealth Office	2011	74
Sir Nigel Sheinwald GCMG	Ambassador to the United States and Permanent Representative to the European Union	2011	73
Sir Elliott Belgrave GCMG, KStJ, KA, CHB, SC	Governor-General of Barbados	2012	95
Dame Cécile La Grenade GCMG, OBE, DStJ	Governor-General of Grenada	2012	73
Dame Marguerite Pindling ON, GCMG	Governor-General of The Bahamas	2014	94
Sir Rodney Williams GCMG, KStJ, KGN, KNH, GCH, GCM	Governor-General of Antigua and Barbuda	2014	78
Catherine Ashton, Baroness Ashton of Upholland LG, GCMG, PC	First Vice-President of the European Commission and European Commissioner for Trade	2015	70
Sir John Sawers GCMG, FRUSI	Chief of the Secret Intelligence Service and Permanent Representative to the United Nations	2015	71
Sir Simon Fraser GCMG	Permanent Under-Secretary for Foreign and Commonwealth Affairs	2016	68
Sir Peter Westmacott GCMG, LVO	Ambassador to the United States, Ambassador to France and Ambassador to Turkey	2016	75
Sir Robert Dadae GCL, GCMG, KStJ	Governor-General of Papua New Guinea	2017	65
Dame Sandra Mason FB, GCMG, KStJ, DA, SC	Governor-General of Barbados	2017	77
Sir Mark Lyall Grant GCMG	National Security Adviser and Permanent Representative to the United Nations	2018	70
Sir Cornelius Smith ON, GCMG	Governor-General of The Bahamas	2019	89
Dame Susan Dougan GCMG, OBE	Governor-General of Saint Vincent and the Grenadines	2020	71
Sir David Attenborough OM, GCMG, CH, CVO, CBE, FRS, FSA, FRSA, FLS, FZS, FRSGS, FRSB	Television broadcaster and conservationist	2020	100
Tim Barrow, Baron Barrow, GCMG, LVO, MBE	Ambassador to the European Union, Ambassador to Russia and Ambassador to Ukraine	2020	62
Sir Julian King GCMG, KCVO	European Commissioner for the Security Union, Ambassador to France and Ambassador to Ireland	2020	62
Simon McDonald, Baron McDonald of Salford GCMG, KCVO	Permanent Under-Secretary for Foreign and Commonwealth Affairs, Ambassador to Germany and Ambassador to Israel	2021	65
Dame Froyla Tzalam GCMG	Governor-General of Belize	2022	
Sir Iain Macleod GCMG	Legal Adviser to the Foreign, Commonwealth and Development Office	2022	
Sir Tofiga Vaevalu Falani GCMG, MBE	Governor-General of Tuvalu	2022	
Mark Sedwill, Baron Sedwill GCMG, PC, FRGS	Cabinet Secretary, Head of the Home Civil Service and National Security Adviser	2022	61
Dame Marcella Liburd GCMG, JP	Governor-General of Saint Kitts and Nevis	2023	73
Sir Simon Gass GCMG, CVO	Chair of the Joint Intelligence Committee and Ambassador to Iran	2023	69
Dame Cynthia Pratt ON, GCMG, CB, CD, JP	Governor-General of The Bahamas	2023	80
Sir Stephen Lovegrove GCMG, KCB	National Security Adviser and Permanent Under-Secretary of State for Defence	2024	59
Sir David Tiva Kapu GCMG	Governor-General of Solomon Islands	2024	
Sir Errol Charles GCMG	Governor-General of Saint Lucia	2024	83
Sir Philip Barton GCMG, OBE	Permanent Under-Secretary of State for Foreign Affairs	2025	63
Sir Stanley John GCMG, KC	Governor-General of Saint Vincent and the Grenadines	2025	75
Dame Barbara Woodward GCMG, OBE	Permanent Representative of the United Kingdom to the United Nations	2026	65

=== Honorary Knights and Dames Grand Cross and Commander ===
See List of current honorary knights and dames of the Order of St Michael and St George.

=== Officers ===
- Prelate: David Urquhart KCMG (former Bishop of Birmingham)
- Chancellor: Catherine Ashton, Baroness Ashton of Upholland LG, GCMG, PC
- Secretary: Sir Philip Barton GCMG, OBE
- Registrar: Dame Karen Pierce DCMG
- King of Arms: Sir Mark Lyall Grant GCMG
- Gentleman Usher of the Blue Rod: Sir Jonathan Taylor KCMG

== Gallery ==
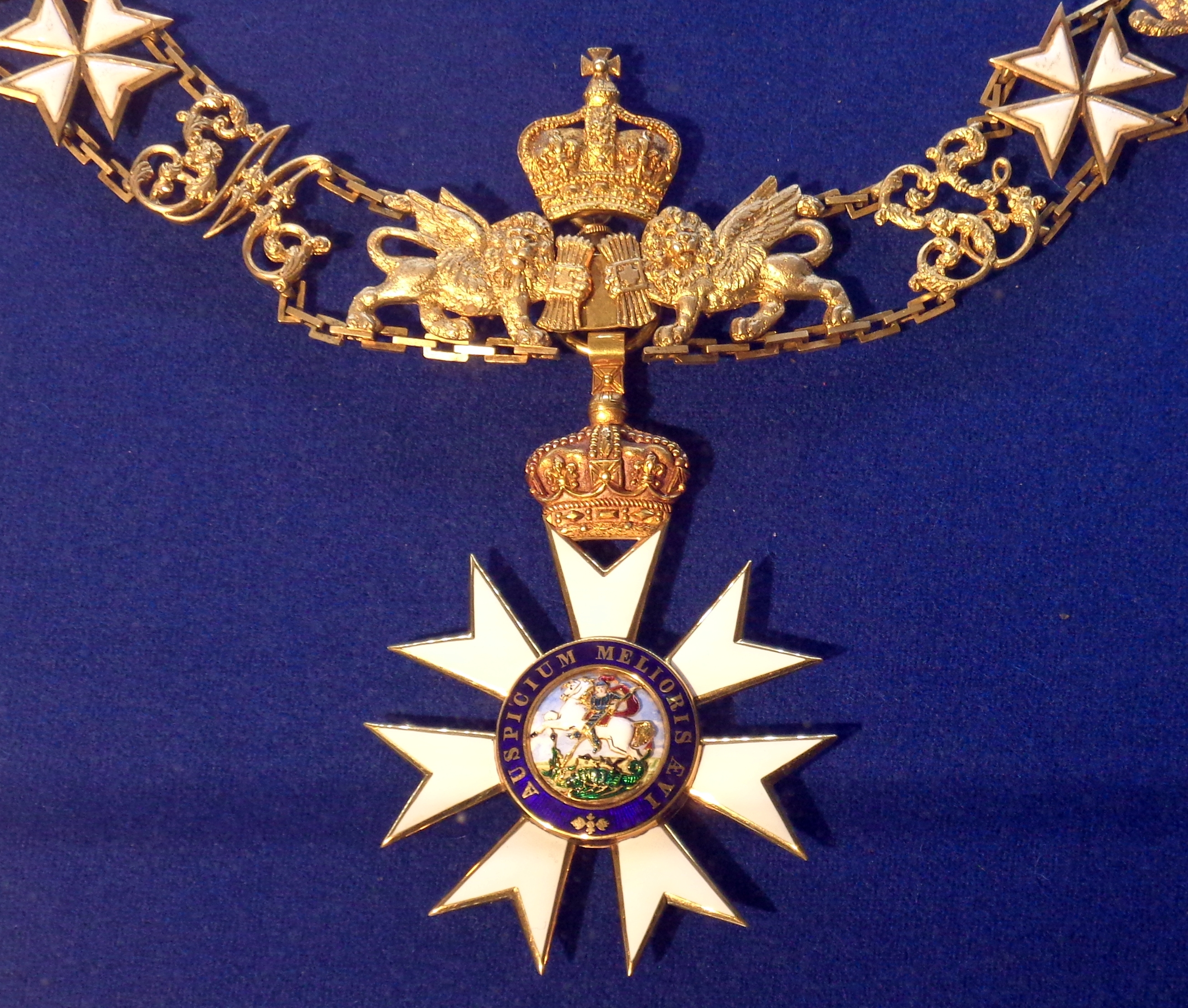
Collar and badge of the Grand Cross

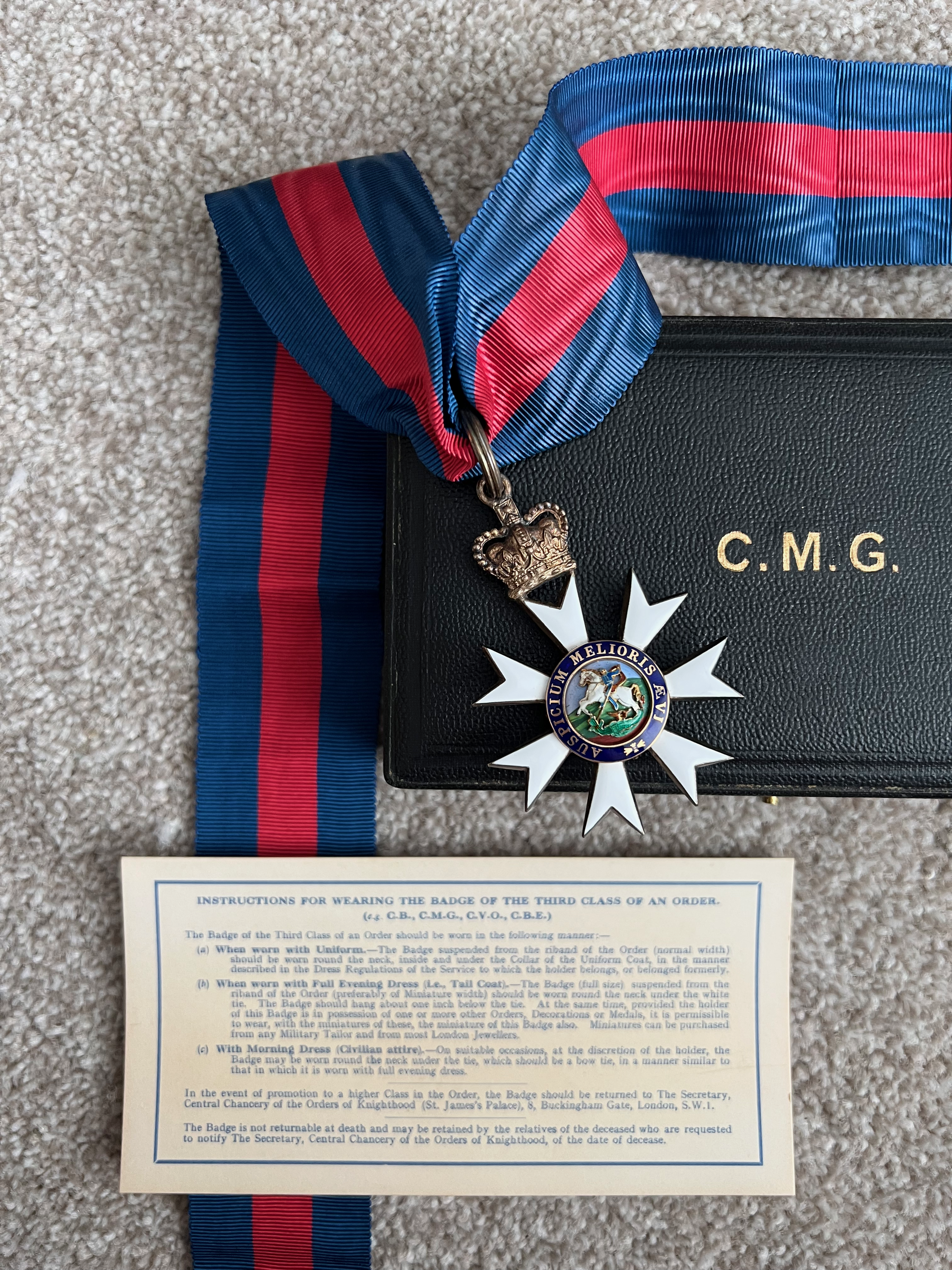
Companion class of the order with the wearer's instruction guide

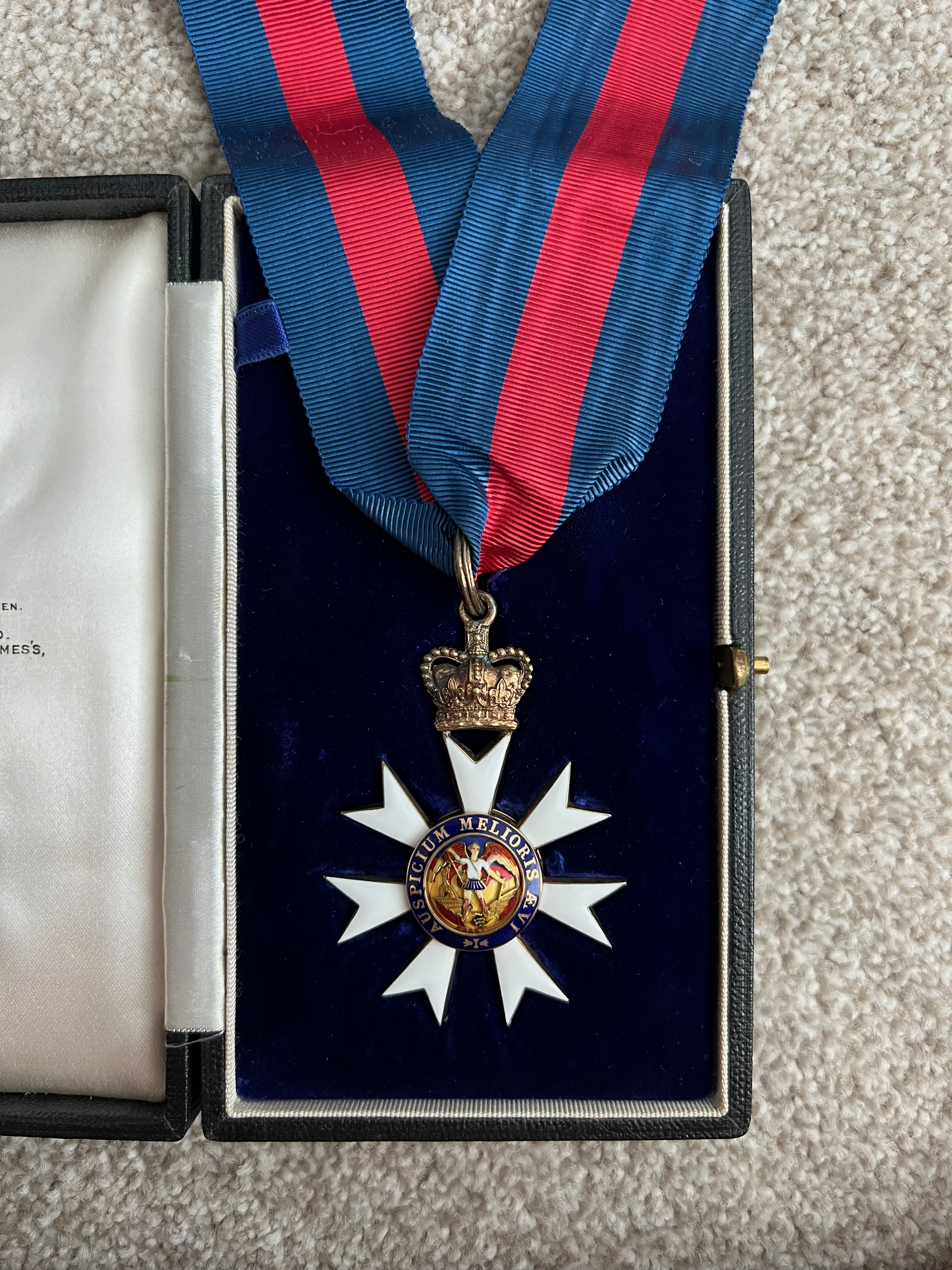
CMG class in a case

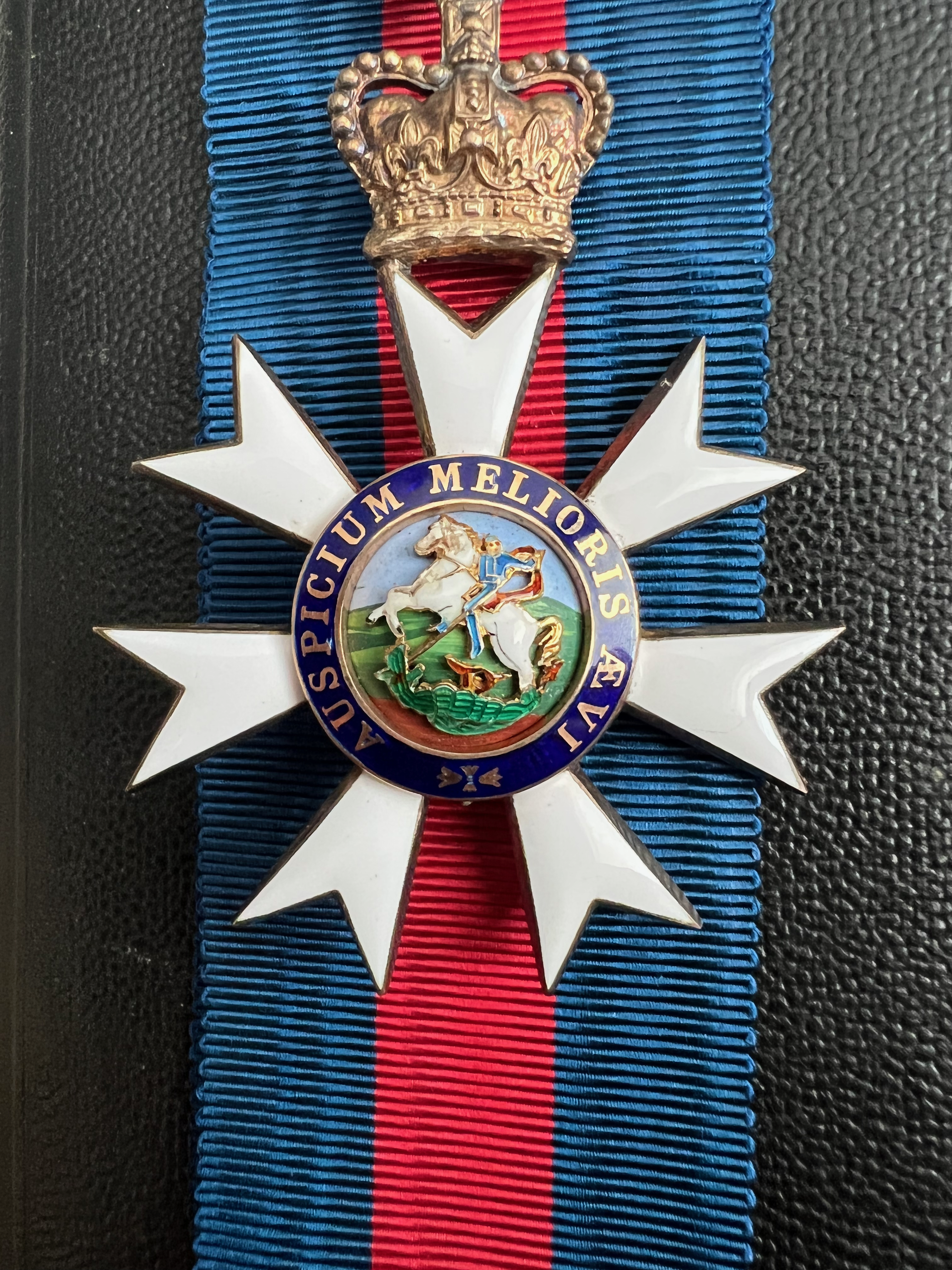
Reverse of a CMG badge showing Saint George

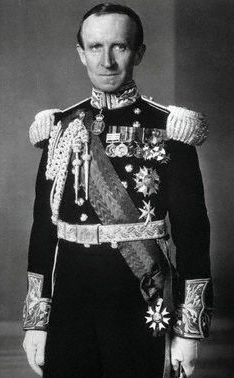
Riband, badge and star of a GCMG worn by John Buchan, 1st Baron Tweedsmuir

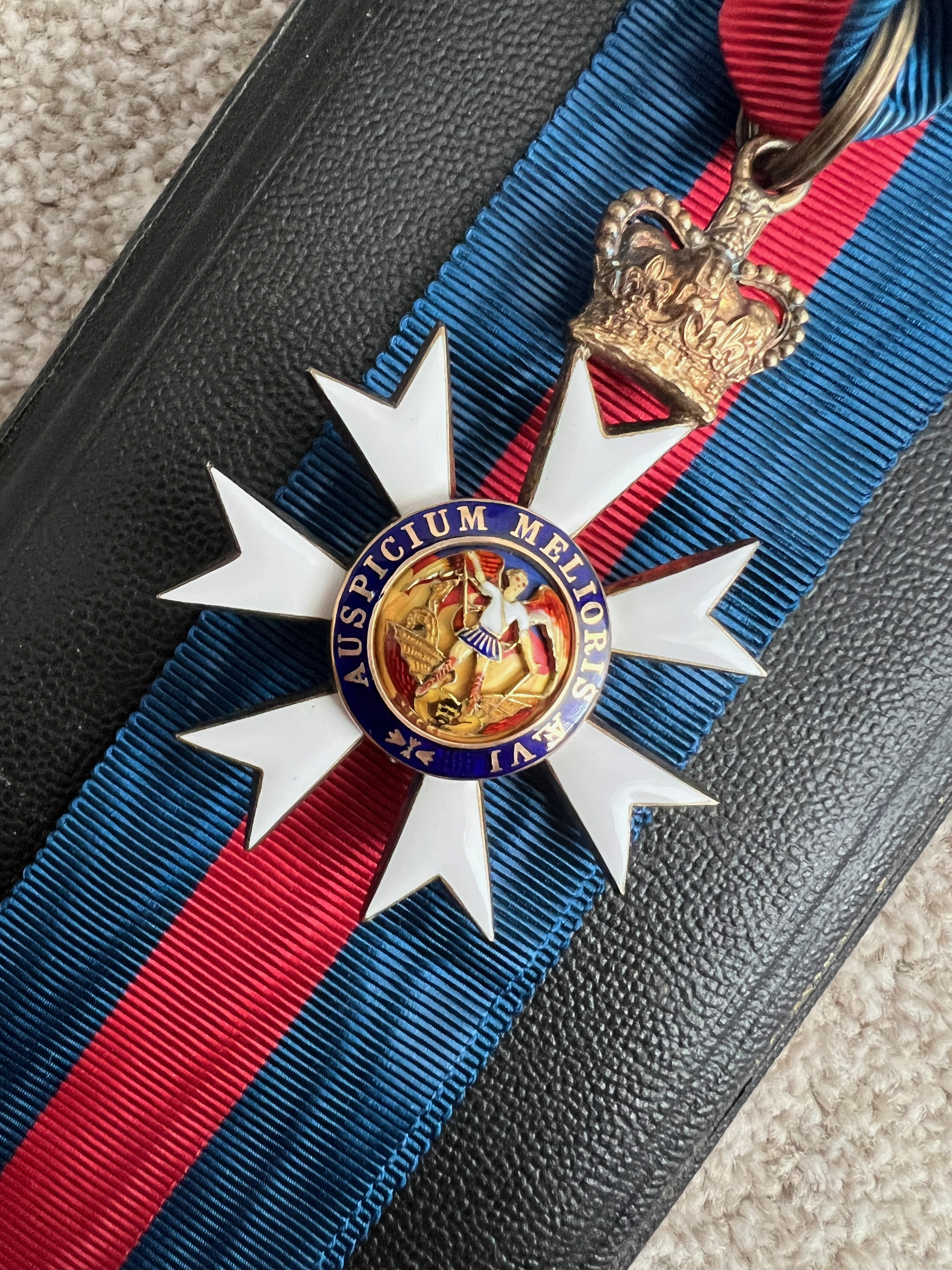
Obverse of the CMG badge showing Saint Michael

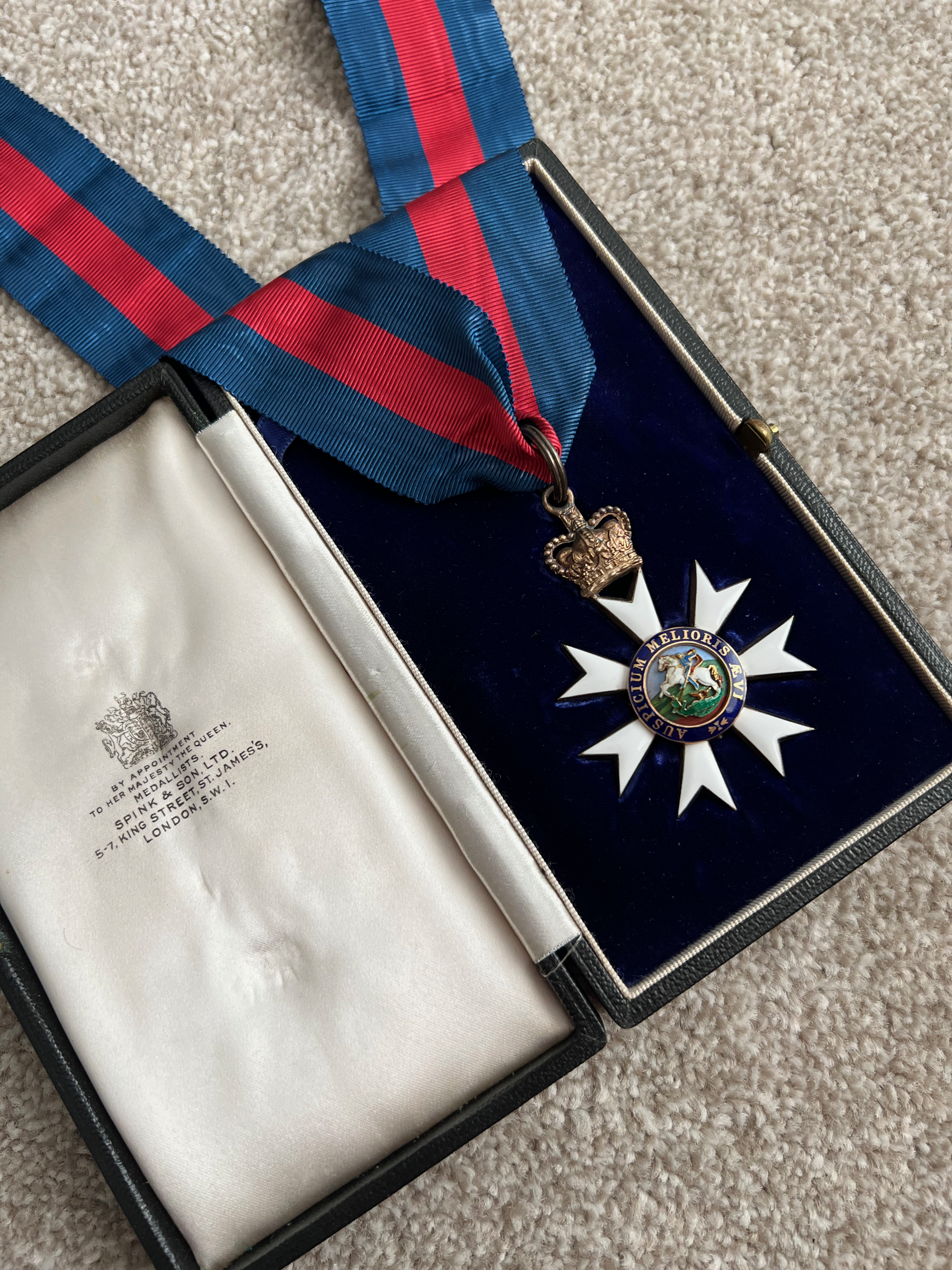
CMG class of the Order of St. Michael & St. George by Spink & Son

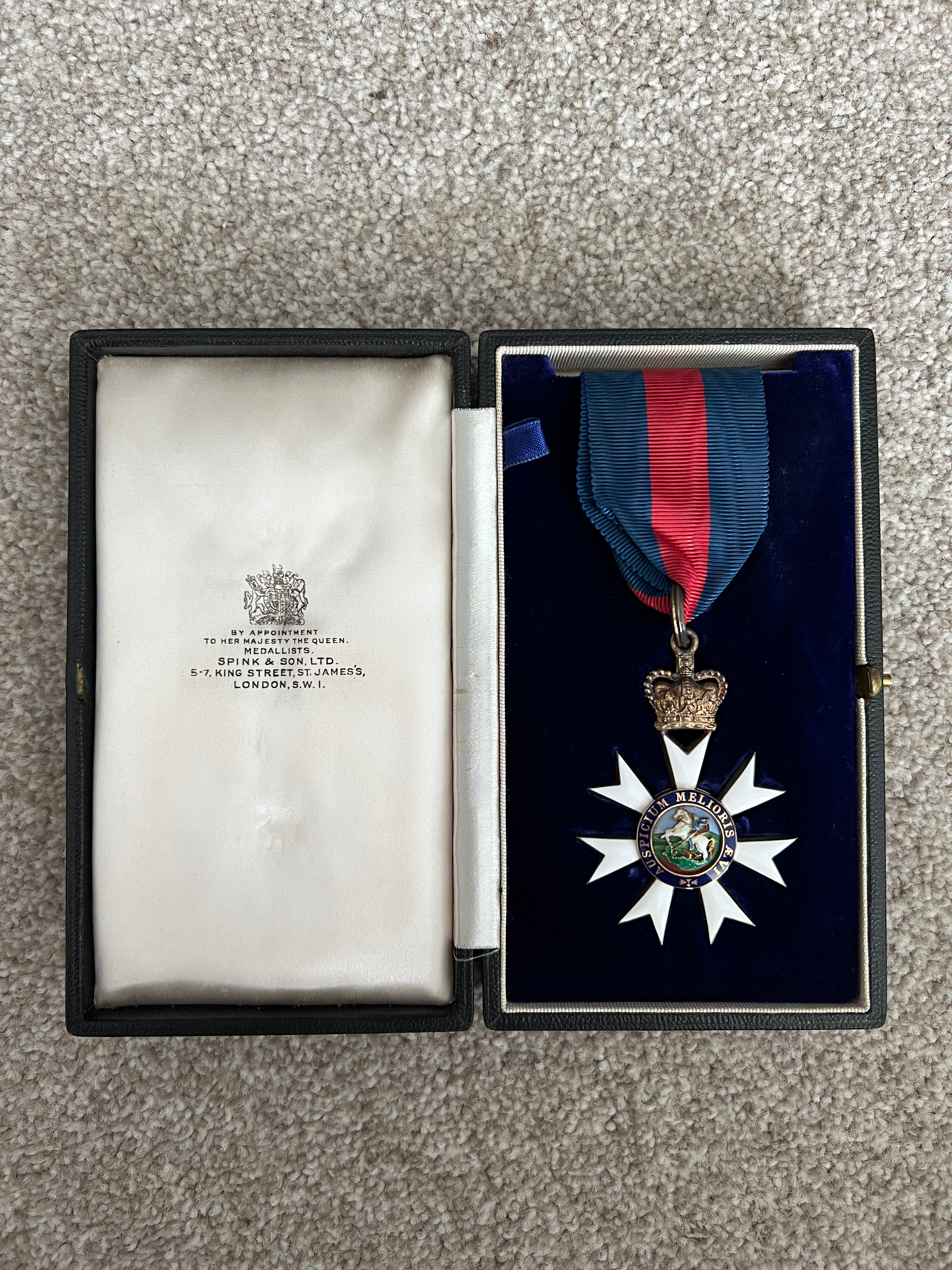
CMG in a case by Spink

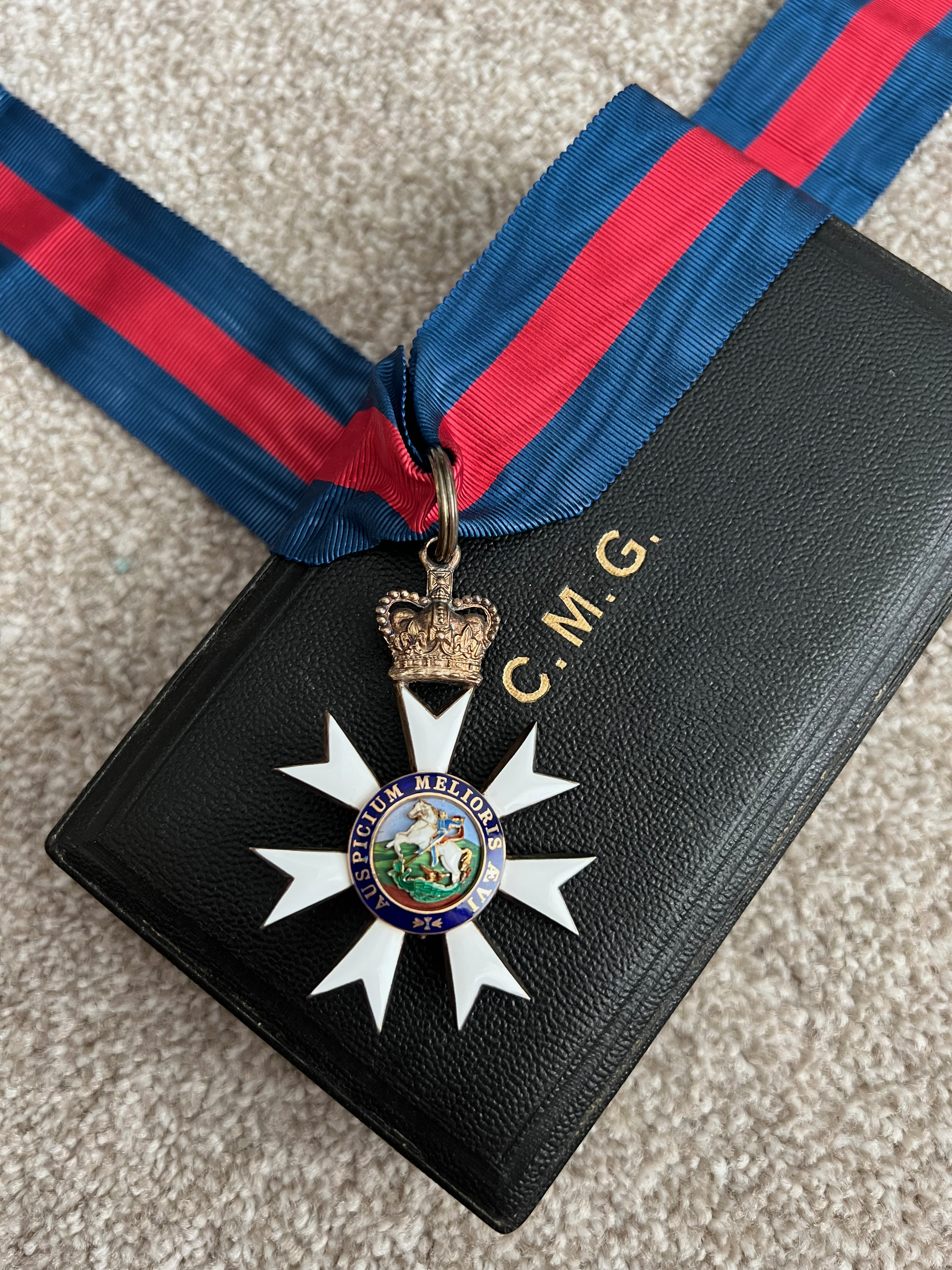
Companion of the Order of St. Michael & St. George

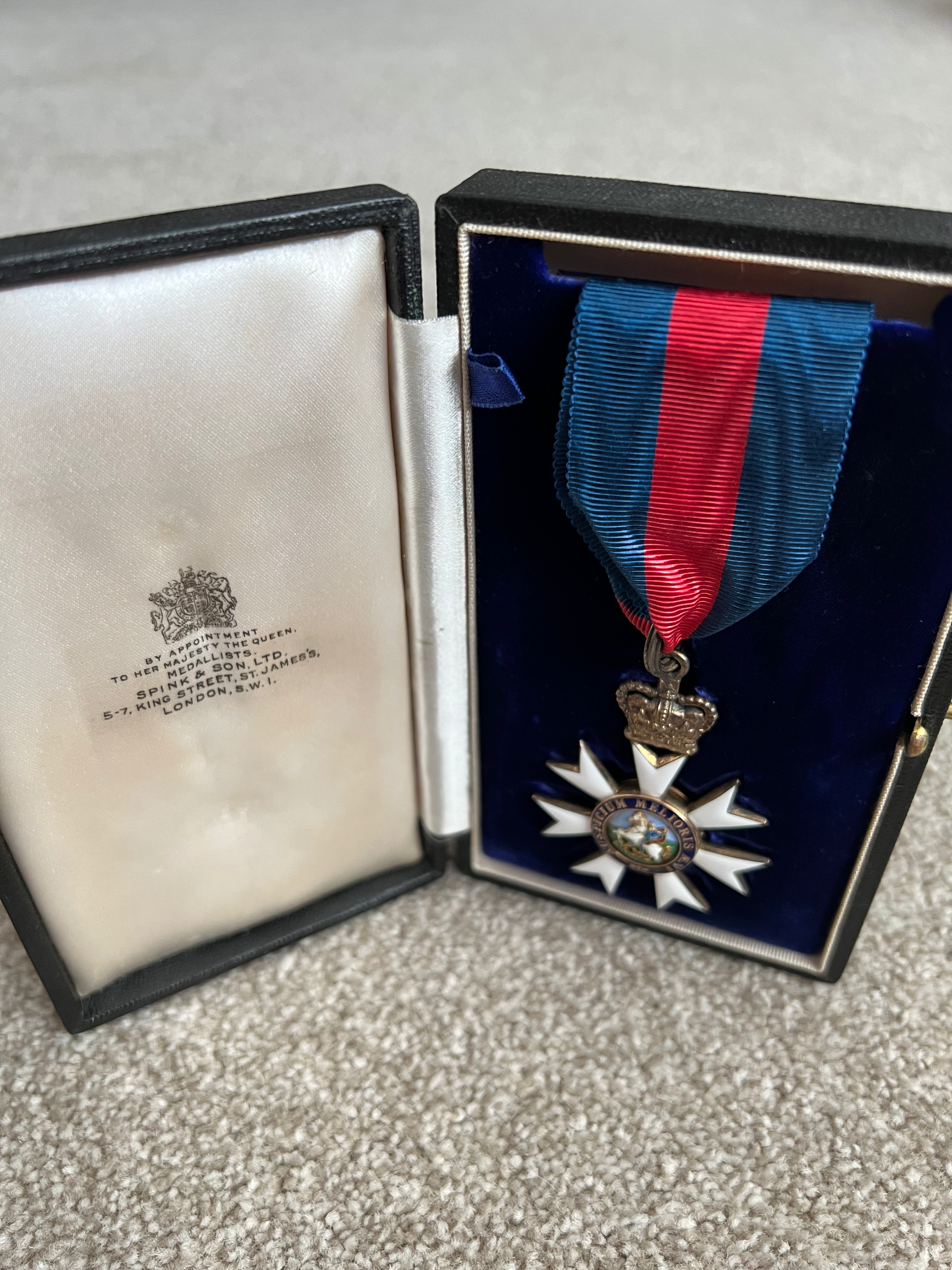
CMG in a case by Spink

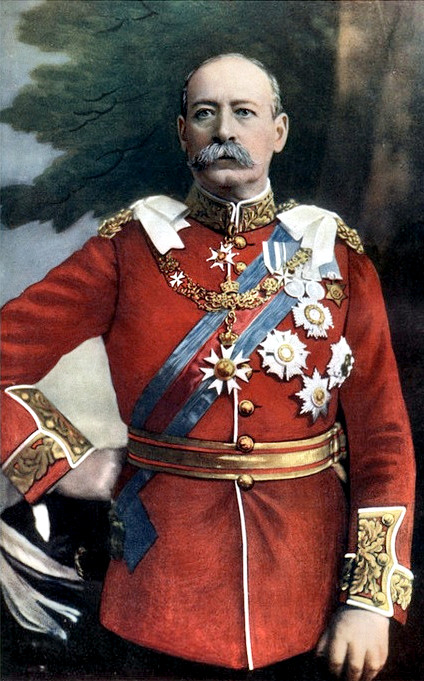
Riband (worn incorrectly), star and collar of GCMG worn by Francis Grenfell, 1st Baron Grenfell

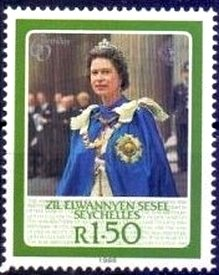
A Seychellois stamp depicting Elizabeth II in robes of the order, 1986

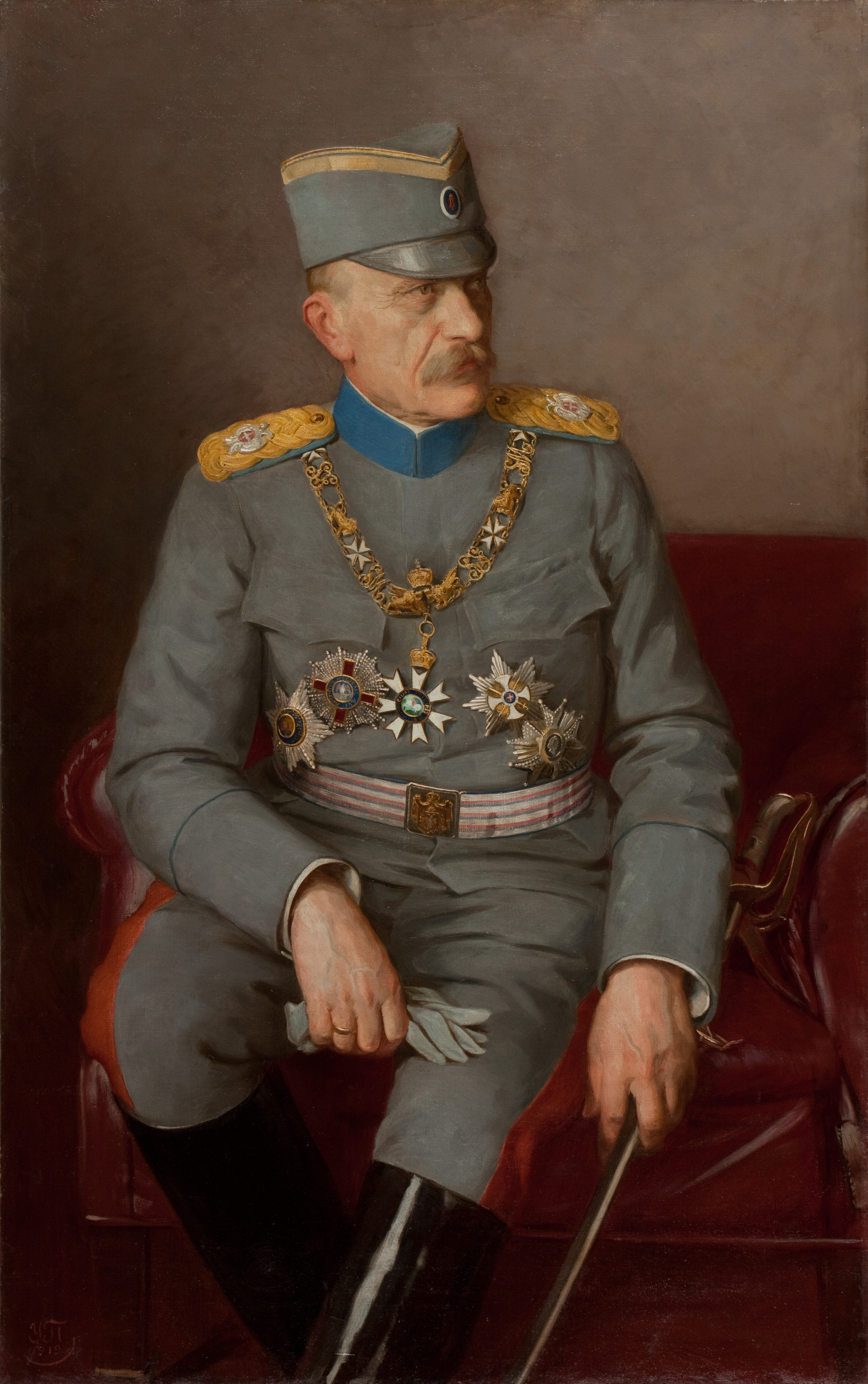
Star and collar of GCMG worn by Serbian Field Marshal Živojin Mišić

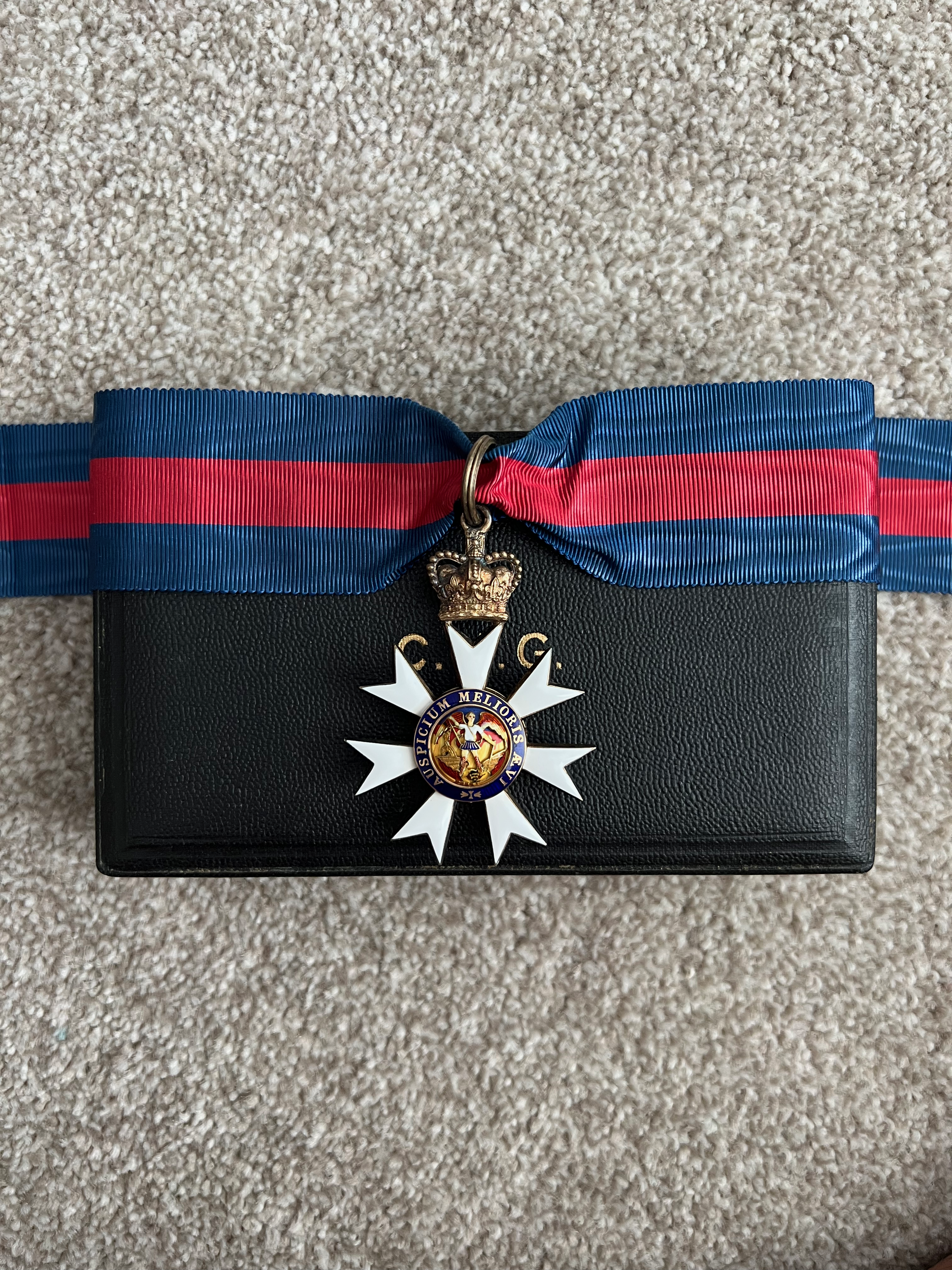
CMG set

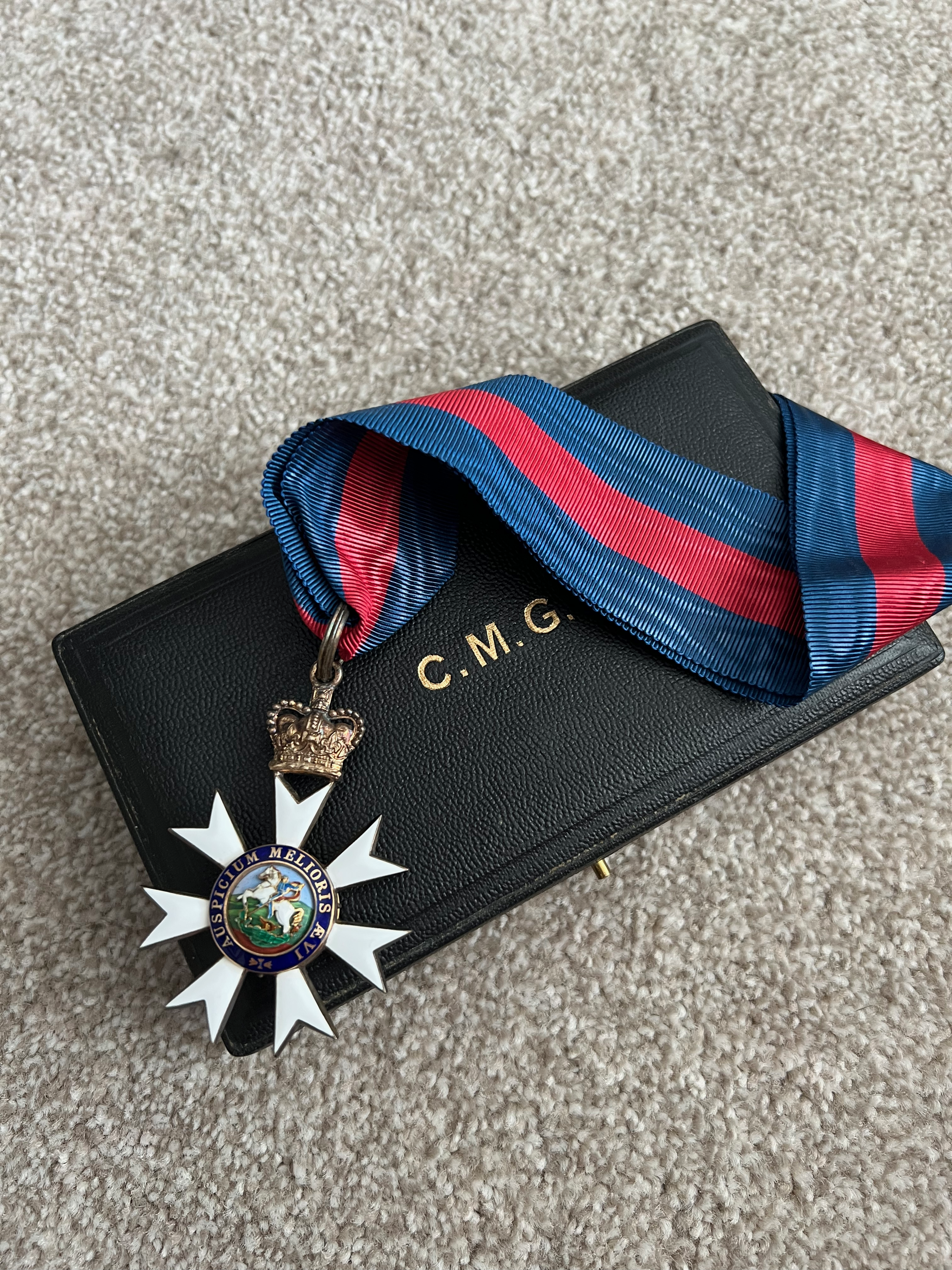
Set of the Companion class

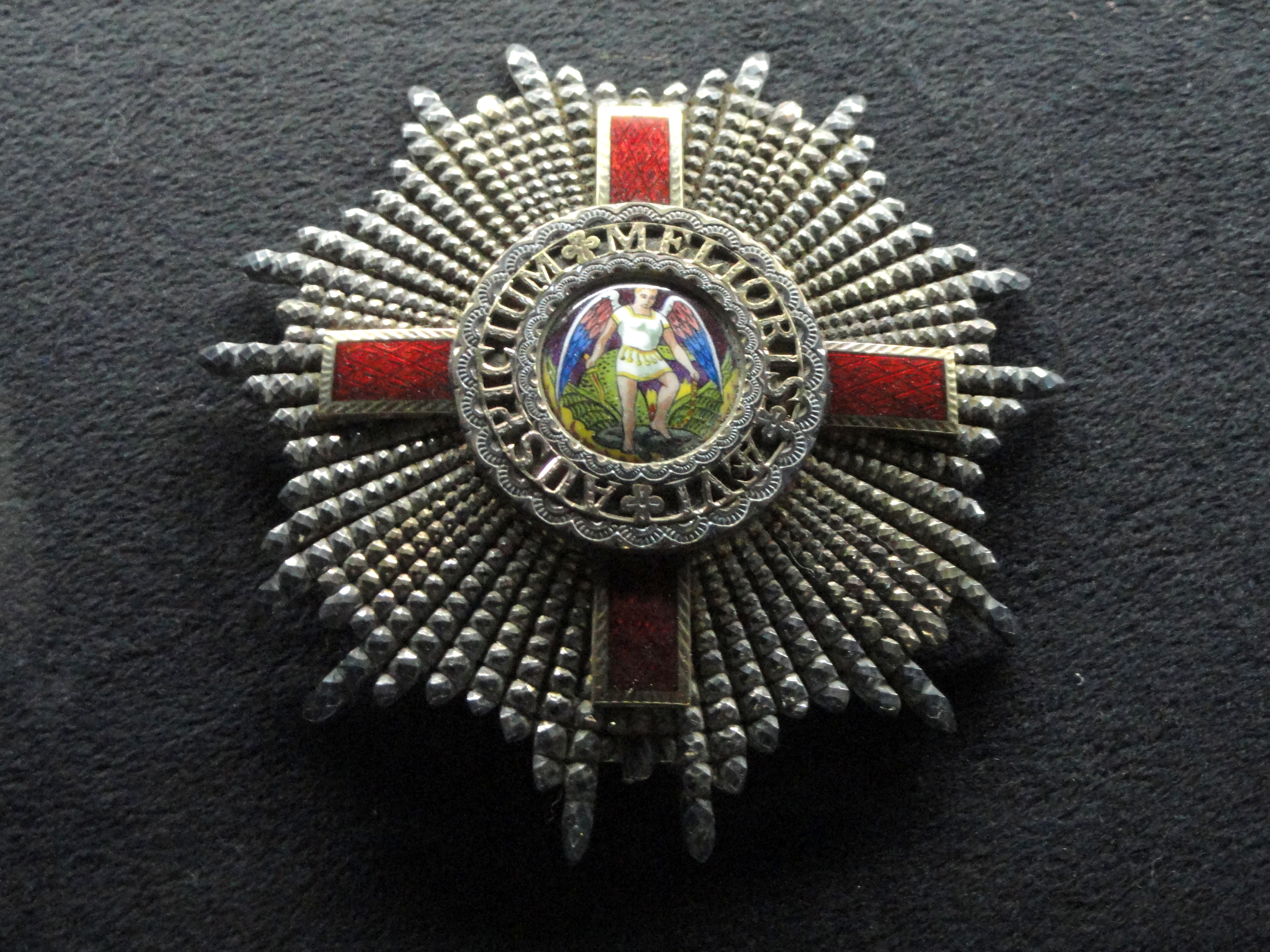
GCMG breast star

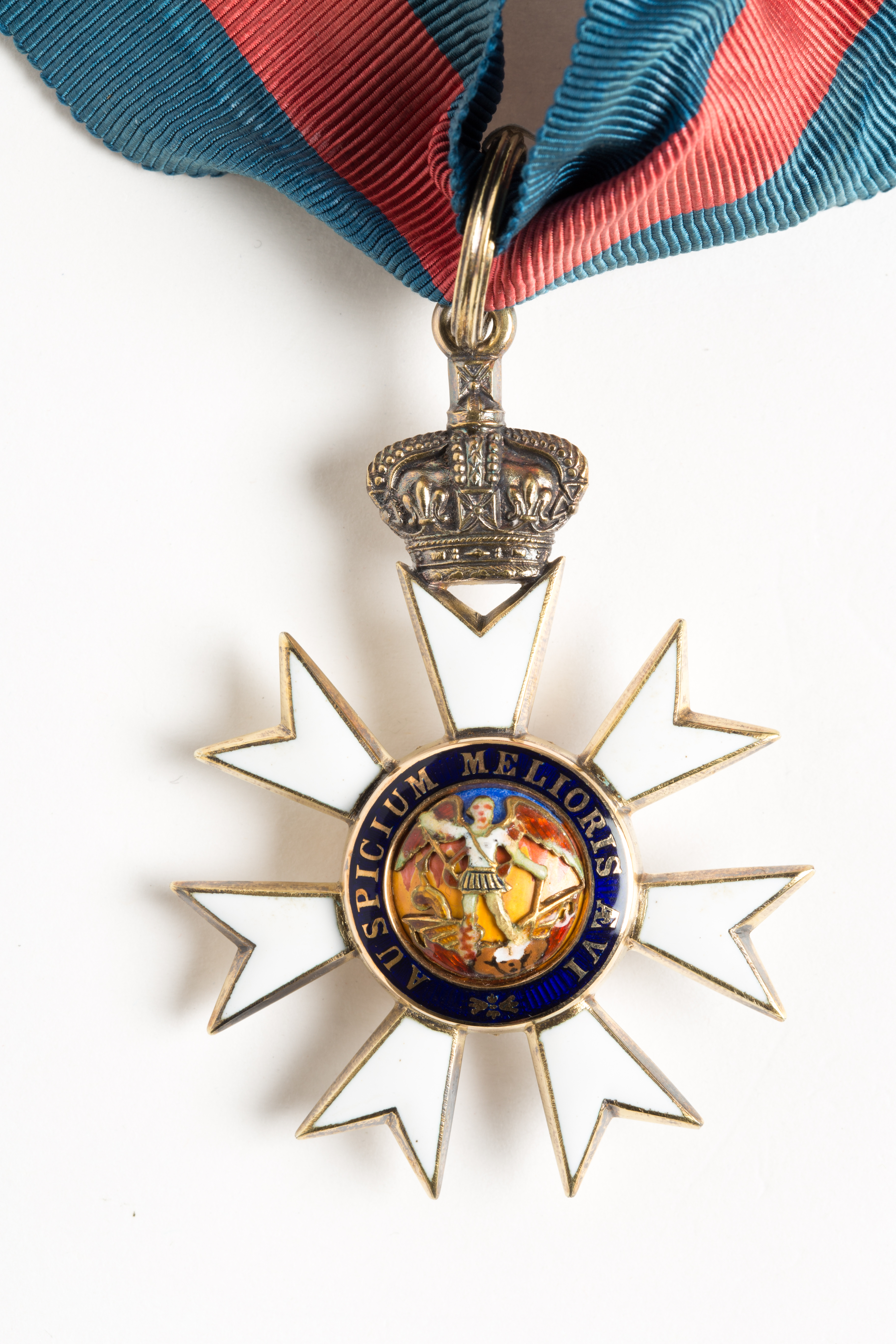
Companion class on a neck riband

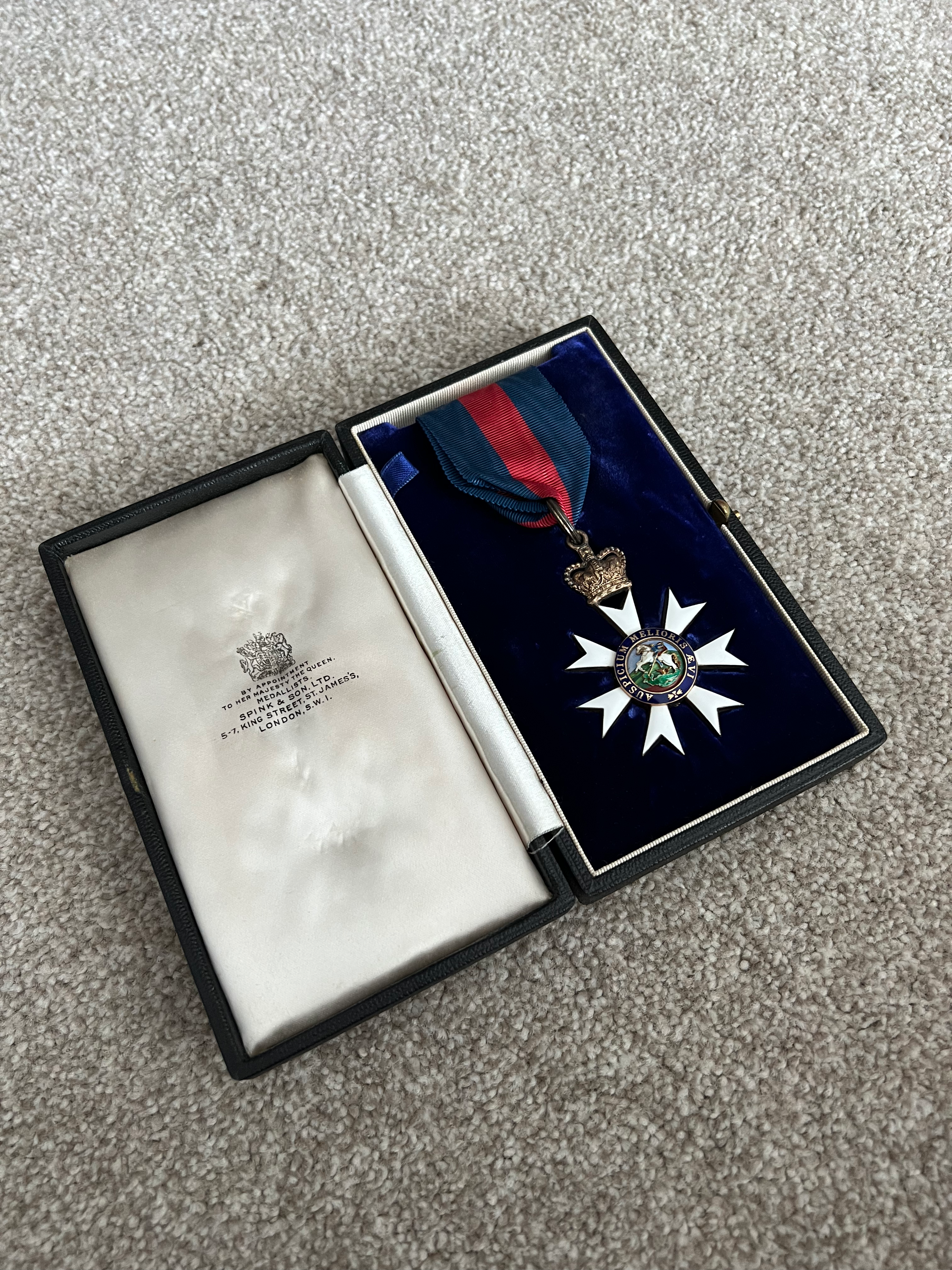
CMG class of the order

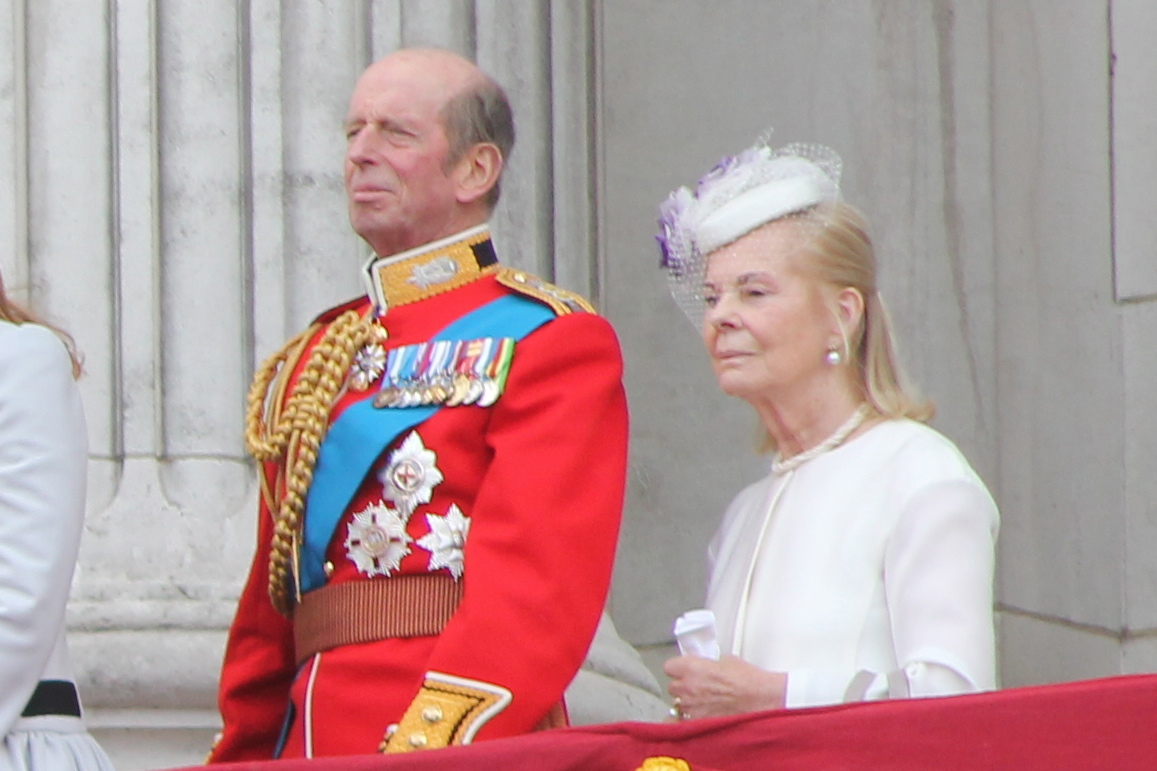
Prince Edward, Duke of Kent, Grand Master of the Order, and Katharine, Duchess of Kent

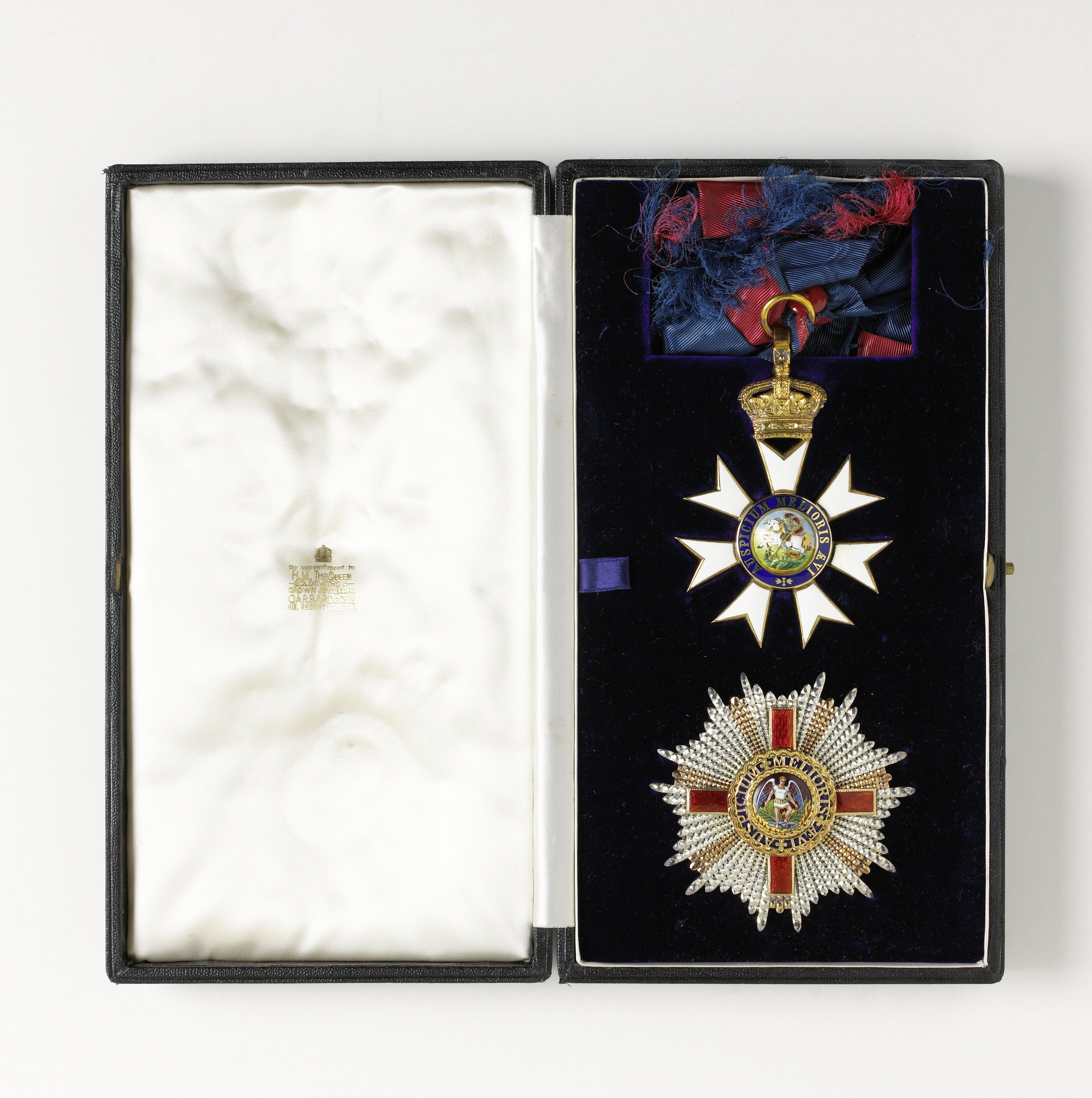
The GCMG set of former Dutch Prime Minister Willem Drees

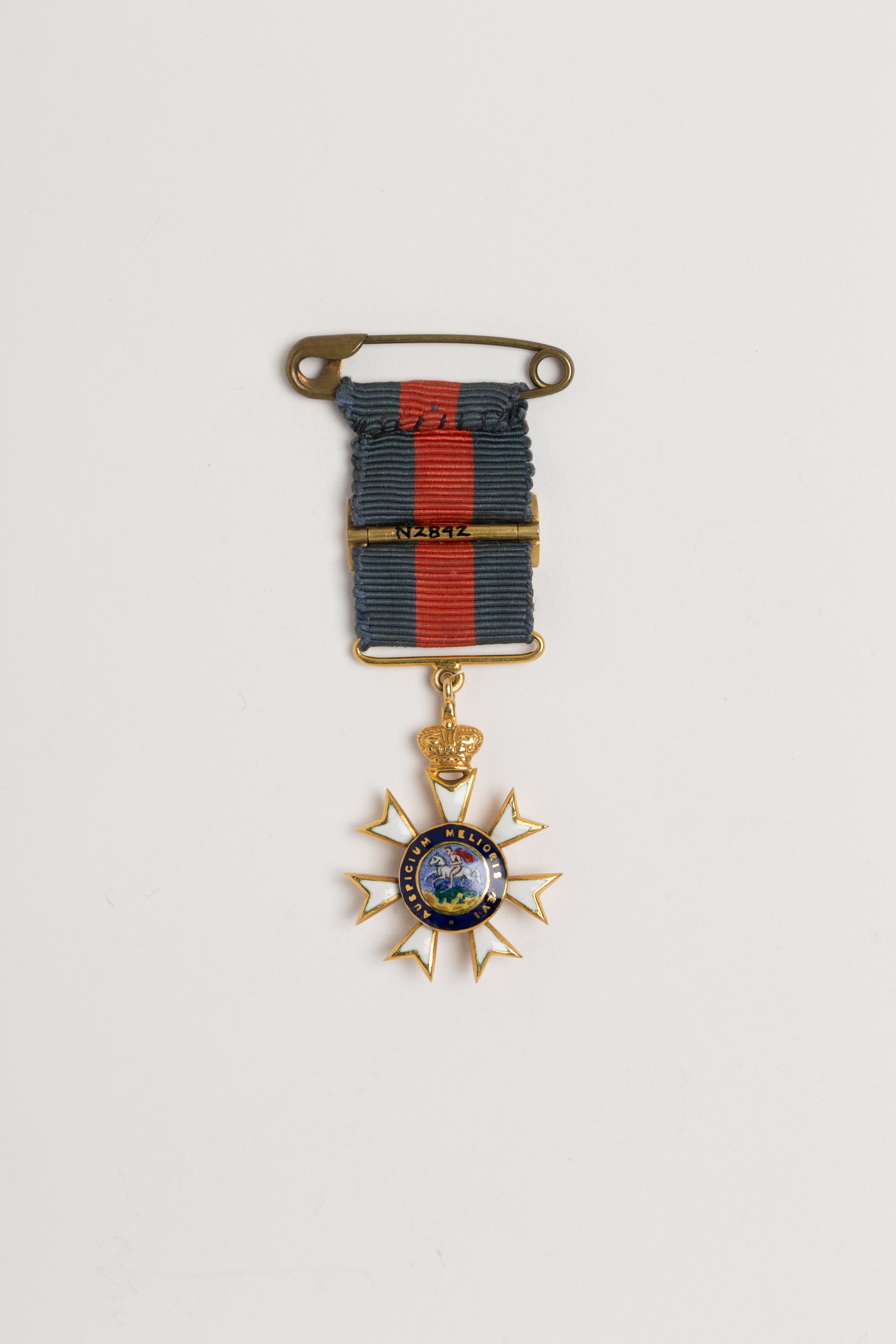
Miniature of the order

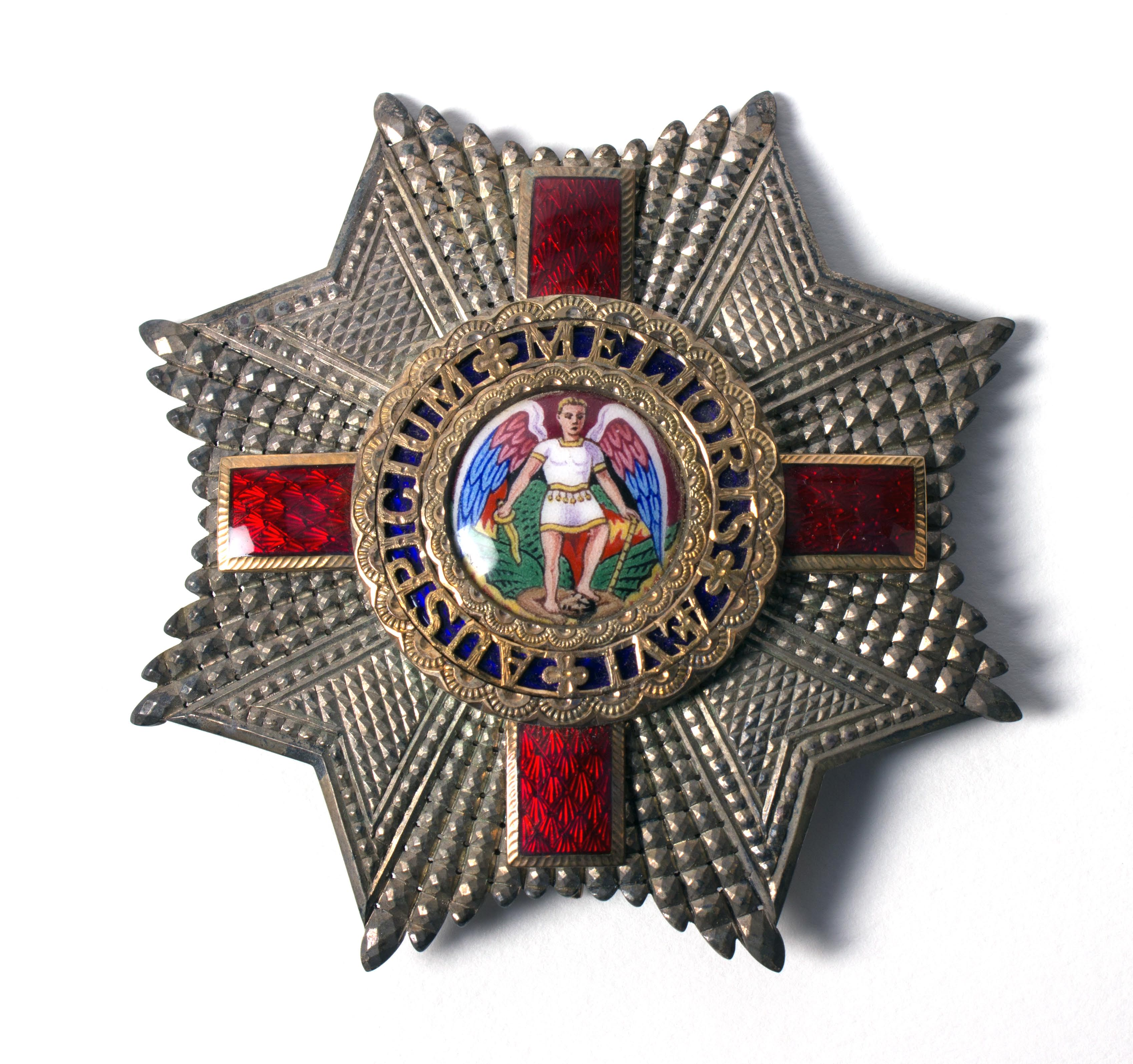
KCMG breast star

== See also ==
- List of people who have declined a British honour
- Order of the Bath
- Order of the British Empire
- Order of the Garter
- Order of the Thistle
- Royal Victorian Order
- Russian Order of St George
