= Order of Excellence =

Order of Excellence may refer to one of the following:

- Alberta Order of Excellence
- Order of Excellence (Bahamas)
- Order of Excellence (Jamaica)
- Order of Excellence of Guyana
