= Order of the National Hero (Bahamas) =

Highest honor of Bahamas

Awarded by the Governor-General of the Bahamas
- Type: Order of chivalry
- Motto: “Freedom and Justice”
- Status: Currently constituted
- Chancellor (ex officio): Governor-General of the Bahamas

Precedence
- Next (higher): None
- Next (lower): Order of the Nation

The Order of the National Hero is the highest honour that can be given by the government of the Bahamas. It was founded in 2016. The first dedicatees of the Order were Sir Lynden Oscar Pindling, Sir Roland Theodore Symonette, Sir Milo Boughton Butler, and Sir Cecil Wallace-Whitfield, all of whom were granted the Order posthumously on July 10, 2018. Members are accorded the style "The Right Excellent" and also entitled to place the post-nominal letters "N.H". after their name.
