= Order of Excellence (Bahamas) =

Awarded by the Governor-General of the Bahamas
- Type: Order of chivalry
- Status: Currently constituted
- Chancellor (ex officio): Governor-General of the Bahamas

Precedence
- Next (higher): Order of the Bahamas
- Next (lower): Order of Distinction

The Order of Excellence is an honour that can be given by the government of the Bahamas. It was founded in 2016.
