= Order of Distinction (Bahamas) =

Bahamas national award

Awarded by the Governor-General of The Bahamas
- Type: Order of chivalry
- Status: Currently constituted
- Chancellor (ex officio): Governor-General of The Bahamas

Precedence
- Next (higher): Order of Excellence
- Next (lower): Order of Merit

The Order of Distinction is an honour that can be given by the government of The Bahamas. It was founded in 2016.
