= Order of the Nation (Bahamas) =

Honour in the Bahamas

Awarded by the Governor-General of the Bahamas
- Type: Order of chivalry
- Status: Currently constituted
- Chancellor (ex officio): Governor-General of the Bahamas
- Post-nominals: ON

Precedence
- Next (higher): Order of the National Hero
- Next (lower): Order of the Bahamas
- Ribbon bar

The Order of the Nation is an honour that can be given by the government of the Bahamas. It was founded in 2016.

Members of the order are styled "The Most Honourable", and members wear the insignia of the order as a decoration while appending the post-nominal letters ON to their name.
