= Graydon Parrish =

American painter (born 1970)

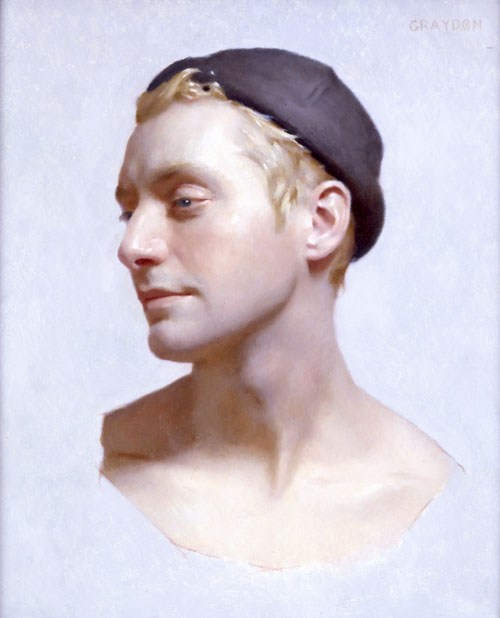
Sean, by Graydon Parrish 15"x18", oil on panel

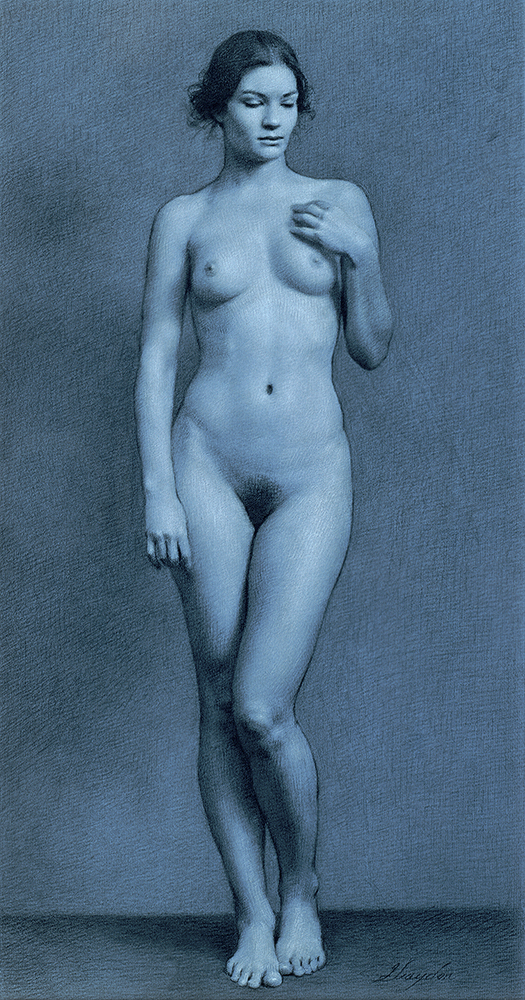
Standing Female Nude, by Graydon Parrish. 23"x12", black and white chalk on toned paper

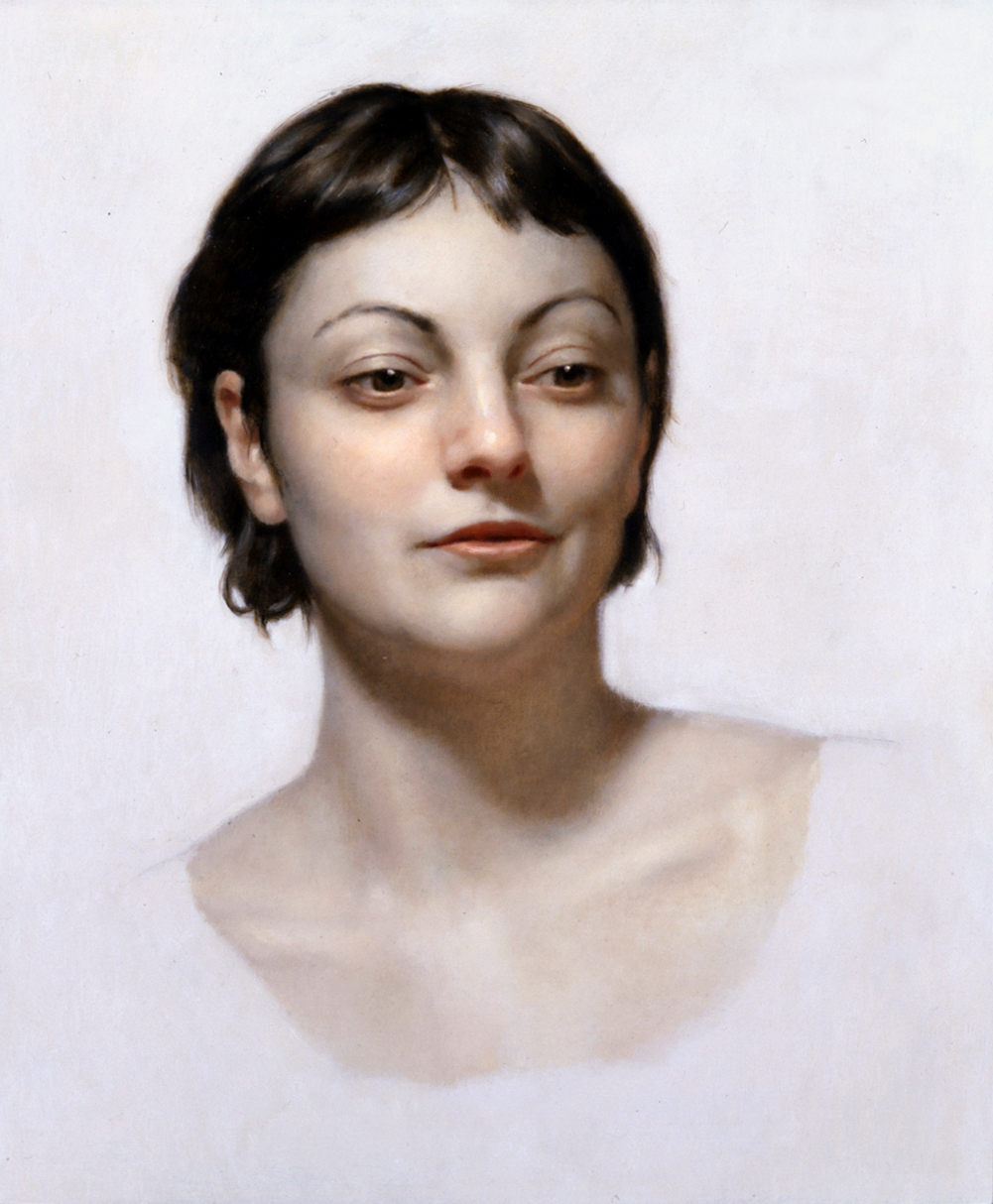
Female Head Study, by Graydon Parrish. 15"x18", oil on panel

Graydon Parrish (born April 3, 1970) is a realist painter living in Austin, Texas. He is both trained in and an exponent of the atelier method which emphasizes classical painting techniques.

== Life ==
Graydon Parrish was born in Phoenix, Arizona, but spent the majority of his childhood in East Texas. His parents, collectors of American and European nineteenth-century art, exposed him to painting at a young age and influenced his choice to pursue an academic figurative style.

Parrish attended the Booker T. Washington High School for the Performing and Visual Arts and graduated in 1988. Unable to find further classical art training, he learned of the newly formed New York Academy of Art in the summer of that year created by Andy Warhol and Stuart Pivar. There, Parrish joined other students who have become leading figures in the classical art revival, including Jacob Collins, founder of the Grand Central Academy of Art where Parrish is now an instructor. At the New York Academy, Parrish met his mentor Michael Aviano, a student himself of illustrator and muralist Frank J. Reilly. Since then Parrish has remodeled color theories by Albert Munsell and Josef Albers to fit traditional painting methods. In some ways, he and his colleagues share the reformist attitude of the Stuckist movement in England and are likewise often at odds with mainstream critical taste.

After graduating from the New York Academy with an MFA in painting, Parrish went on to study at Amherst College, earning an additional B.A. and majoring in independent studies. His large thesis painting, Remorse, Despondence and the Acceptance of an Early Death, an allegory of the early AIDS epidemic, helped earn Parrish summa cum laude honors and was purchased by the trustees for the Mead Art Museum. Parrish went on to show both at Hirschl and Adler Galleries in New York and Galerie Benamou in Paris, where he still exhibits. His subjects were mainly allegories and nudes. In 2001, the Tyler Museum of Art purchased "Victory", a nude inspired by the antique bronze "An Athlete Crowning Himself" in the J. Paul Getty Museum. Parrish's nudes are also informed by his research in French 19th-century art. With Gerald M. Ackerman, a leading expert in the field, he has revised and annotated the Cours de Dessins by Jean-Léon Gérôme and Charles Bargue.

In 2002, Douglas Hyland, the director of the New Britain Museum of American Art, approached Parrish to create an allegorical tribute to the terrorist attacks of September 11, 2001. The completed painting, The Cycle of Terror and Tragedy, is over 18 feet long and is one of the largest realist paintings ever created in America. It has become somewhat controversial, both for its unabashedly academic style inspired by Jacques-Louis David and William Bouguereau and for its highly symbolic content, said to express the cycle of denial and tragedy. It has been compared and contrasted with Pablo Picasso's Guernica and Théodore Géricault's The Raft of the Medusa, both also comments on catastrophes. Today it hangs in the Chase Wing of the New Britain Museum of Art next to figurative pieces by Julie Heffernan and Chuck Close. It has become a regular destination and subject of debate for New England residents.

From 1994 to 2008 Parrish maintained a studio in Amherst, Massachusetts, sharing a home with Amherst College professor Donald S. Pitkin, anthropologist and author of The House that Giacomo Built: History of an Italian Family 1898-1978. Pitkin's ideas of community and family influenced Parrish's subsequent works, including his current Freedom Red project, a synthesis of art and activism which donates proceeds to HIV/AIDS charities. In 2008, he relocated to Austin, Texas to be near his family, teach, and contribute to the growing independent Austin art scene, including Arthouse at the Jones Center, the Blanton Museum of Art and the Austin Museum of Art.

== Work ==
Graydon Parrish's style is classical realism. Parrish counts among his contemporary influences realist painters Odd Nerdrum, Jacob Collins, Steven Assael, Christopher Pugliese and Daniel Sprick, as well as Bridget Riley.

Parrish's collectors include Christopher Forbes, Michael Huffington, Diane Sawyer, Robert and Chris Emmons, Paul Giamatti, Carmen Dell'Orefice, Peter Martino, Loyd and Renée Greif, and Paul and Melinda Sullivan. His public collections include the Mead Art Museum in Amherst, Massachusetts, the Austin Museum of Art in Austin, Texas, the Blanton Museum of Art, Austin Texas, the Tyler Museum of Art in Tyler, Texas, and the New Britain Museum of American Art in New Britain, Connecticut.
