= Dina Brodsky =

American painter

- Born: Minsk, Byelorussian SSR, Soviet Union
- Education: New York Academy of Art (MFA); University of Massachusetts Amherst (BFA)
- Known for: Painting; Miniature Painting; Drawing
- Website: http://www.dinabrodsky.com

Dina Brodsky is an American contemporary realist miniaturist, painter, and curator. She is also a social media influencer.

== Early life and education ==
Born in Minsk, Belarus, Dina Brodsky moved to the United States in 1991 and grew up in Brookline, Massachusetts. She studied at the University of Massachusetts, Amherst, before earning her MFA at the New York Academy of Art. Brodsky lived in New York City before moving to Boston in 2019.

== Career ==
Brodsky is a contemporary realist miniaturist, painter, and curator.

She has also taught privately in several institutions, including the Brookline Center for the Arts and the Metropolitan Museum of Art.

=== Art projects ===
==== Bird by Bird ====
Brodsky has a large following on Instagram, and as a result, began a global project called "Bird by Bird" in which photographers from all over the world send her images of birds. Brodsky paints each animal, each work measuring from 1.5 x 1.5 inches to 9 x 7 inches.

==== One More Shelter ====
One More Shelter is a series of small paintings, considered miniatures, that Brodsky commenced in 2012. She traveled throughout the United States to discover and visit the abandoned homes and buildings that are depicted in this series of paintings. The abandoned interiors, in disarray, are congruous to the artist's plight to the United States from the former Soviet Union with her family. The decay also contrasts with the hopeful future their inhabitants once had for these abandoned homes. In some paintings, a glimmer of hope is symbolized by birds or light penetrating the dilapidated windows of each interior.

==== Cycling Guide to Lilliput ====
Started in 2013, Cycling Guide to Lilliput is a series of paintings of the Northern German countryside that Brodsky painted while on a several months long solo cycling trip. All the paintings are on tondo or round plexiglass panels measuring 2 inches in diameter. Brodsky exhibited this series in a solo exhibition in 2015 at Island Weiss Gallery in New York City.

==== Secret Life of Trees ====
In 2016, Brodsky asked hundreds of thousands of followers of her various social media outlets, including Facebook and Instagram, to send her photos of trees and corresponding stories. Each story was personal and kept secret by the artist. Using mostly these photos as references for her drawings, Brodsky started the series called The Secret Life of Trees, comprising over 100 drawings of trees, all no larger than 11 x 14 inches and some as small as 3 x 5 inches. Some drawings were done only in ballpoint pen, while others were also painted with oil paint. Brodsky exhibited this series in a solo exhibition in 2016 at Bernarducci Meisel Gallery in New York City.

=== Curatorial projects ===
Brodsky has curated several exhibitions such as 'Point of Origin' at the Lodge Gallery in 2015, followed by 'Palette' at Abend Gallery in Denver, CO. and 'Sketchbook Vol. 1' at Sugarlift Gallery in 2019, both in New York City.

Point of Origin is a group exhibition curated by Brodsky in 2015, that included paintings by 50 artists, all of which, were on a painter's palette. Some of the artists included in the exhibition were Steven Assael, Alonsa Guevara, Marshall Jones, Alex Kanevsky, Tim Lowly, and Daniel Maidman.

Brodsky continued the curatorial project, curating a second group exhibition of painter's palettes at Abend Gallery in Denver, CO. The exhibition, entitled Palette opened in 2017. The exhibition included paintings on palettes by Steven Assael, Alonsa Guevara, F. Scott Hess, Daniel Maidman, and many more.

Sketchbook Vol. 1 is a group exhibition curated by Brodsky, in 2019, that included 14 sketchbooks, by 14 different artists, that were on view for visitors to peruse. These sketchbooks are not for sale. The goal of the exhibition is to introduce the artist's process to the viewer because sketchbooks are used by artists a tool to document their artistic ideas. The exhibition is on view at Sugarlift Gallery in Long Island City. The exhibition included sketchbooks by David Morales, Diana Corvelle, Dilleen Marsh, Paul Heaston, Dina Brodsky, Evan Kitson, Guno Park, Joshua Henderson, Luis Colan, Marshall Jones, Nicolas V. Sanchez, Sarah Sager, Ted Schmidt, and Vi Luong.

== Other activities ==
Brodsky has used her art and platform to raise money and facilitate change through social impact.

Brodsky curates the popular Instagram page for Fine Artists Blue Review and in 2021 created the Blue Review Art Prize. With this prize, Brodsky raised $15,000 for the charity Feeding America and $10,000 in prizes to participating artists.

In August 2020, Dina Brodsky launched an Instagram campaign to raise funds to help Russian Baby Sofia Darbiyan who was diagnosed with Spinal Muscular Atrophy (SMA). This was a diagnosis that was fatal and the medicine that could save her life had to be administered by the time the baby was 2 years old, it was not covered by health insurance, and cost 2.1 million dollars. Brodsky launched a campaign on Instagram called #BirdsforSofia where artists would donate an image of their artwork and raise funds and awareness of this disease. In less than one month, thousands of artists participated in the viral campaign -the funding was secured for the life-saving medicine. Many of the artworks were also selected to be exhibited at Sugarlift Gallery in New York City where they were sold and proceeds went to funding to research Spinal Muscular Atrophy.

In June 2021, a second campaign for another baby, Darina Sorokina, with SMA was started. This time, artists could donate an image of their artwork towards an NFT that would be auctioned off to raise the funds for the life saving medication. Since then Birds for Sofia became a registered non-profit organization through which artists donate funds and artwork to support both medical research and individual children who need medical funds. To this day, Birds for Sofia has helped other children with rare medical diseases.

== Private collections ==
Private collectors who own Brodsky paintings include HRH Prince of Wales, Kip Forbes, Brooke Shields, and Eileen Guggenheim.

== Exhibitions ==
- Present, Past in Galerie Mokum (2024)
- Dina Brodsky at the Mμseum (2013)
- Miniature & Majestic (2014)
- Voyeur (2014)
- Looking out, Looking in
- Cycling Guide to Lilliput
