= Eileen Guggenheim =

American art historian

- Education: Princeton University (PhD)
- Occupations: Art historian, Academic administrator
- Employer: New York Academy of Art
- Title: Chair of the Board of Trustees
- Spouse: Russell Wilkinson

Eileen Guggenheim is an American art historian and academic administrator. She is the chair of the board of trustees for the New York Academy of Art (NYAA) and previously served as the institution's Dean of Students. Guggenheim has been a prominent figure in the New York art world and has received significant media attention regarding her professional association with the financier and convicted child sex offender Jeffrey Epstein.

== Early life and education ==
Eileen Guggenheim grew up in New Jersey. Her family owned dress shops and is distinct from another Guggenheim family prominent in the art industry. Guggenheim earned her Ph.D. in Art History from Princeton University in 1982. Her dissertation work is archived by the Department of Art & Archaeology under the name Eileen Guggenheim Wilkinson.

== Career ==
Guggenheim has held leadership roles at the New York Academy of Art for several decades. She served as the dean of students during the 1990s before transitioning to the Board of Trustees, where she eventually became Chair.

Her tenure has occasionally faced internal scrutiny. In 1994, the school's co-founder, Stuart Pivar, filed a lawsuit against the academy and its trustees, including Guggenheim and her husband, Russell Wilkinson. Pivar alleged that Wilkinson, then the Board Chairman, had engaged in nepotism by appointing Guggenheim as Dean. The lawsuit was eventually dismissed, and Guggenheim defended her record, noting the expansion of the curriculum under her guidance.

== Connection to Jeffrey Epstein ==
Guggenheim has faced criticism regarding her interactions with Jeffrey Epstein, who served on the NYAA board from 1987 to 1994.

In 2019 and 2020, the artist and NYAA alumna Maria Farmer alleged that Guggenheim facilitated her introduction to Epstein and his associate Ghislaine Maxwell. Farmer stated that during her graduate thesis exhibition in 1995, Guggenheim pressured her to sell a painting to Epstein and Maxwell at a discounted price to "make them happy."

Farmer further alleged that Guggenheim invited her and other students to Epstein's Zorro Ranch in New Mexico in 1995. Farmer claimed that after being sexually assaulted by Epstein and Maxwell at a separate location in 1996, she reported the abuse to Guggenheim, who allegedly dismissed the claims.

Guggenheim denied Farmer's account. In statements to the press, she said she did not recall introducing Farmer to Epstein or pressuring her to sell art. While she initially denied visiting Epstein's ranch, she later corrected her statement to acknowledge a visit but denied witnessing any sexual misconduct or abuse.

Following the release of the documentary Jeffrey Epstein: Filthy Rich in 2020, a student-led petition circulated calling for Guggenheim's resignation. The NYAA Board of Trustees commissioned an independent investigation by the law firm Walden Macht & Haran. The report, released in June 2020, concluded there was no evidence Guggenheim was aware of or enabled Epstein's abuse. Consequently, the board issued a unanimous vote of confidence in Guggenheim. Critics questioned the independence of the investigation, noting the firm's prior representation of Guggenheim.

== Personal life ==
Guggenheim married Russell Wilkinson, an investment manager and the former chairman of NYAA.
