= Walter Erlebacher =

German sculptor and professor

- Born: November 22, 1933; Frankfurt, Germany
- Died: August 20, 1991 (aged 57); Elkins Park, Pennsylvania
- Education: Pratt Institute
- Known for: Sculptor
- Notable work: Jesus Breaking Bread
- Spouse: Martha Mayer Erlebacher

Walter Erlebacher (November 22, 1933 – August 20, 1991) was a sculptor, professor of sculpture and human anatomy at the University of the Arts in Philadelphia, and a consultant and lecturer at the New York Academy of Art.

== Works ==
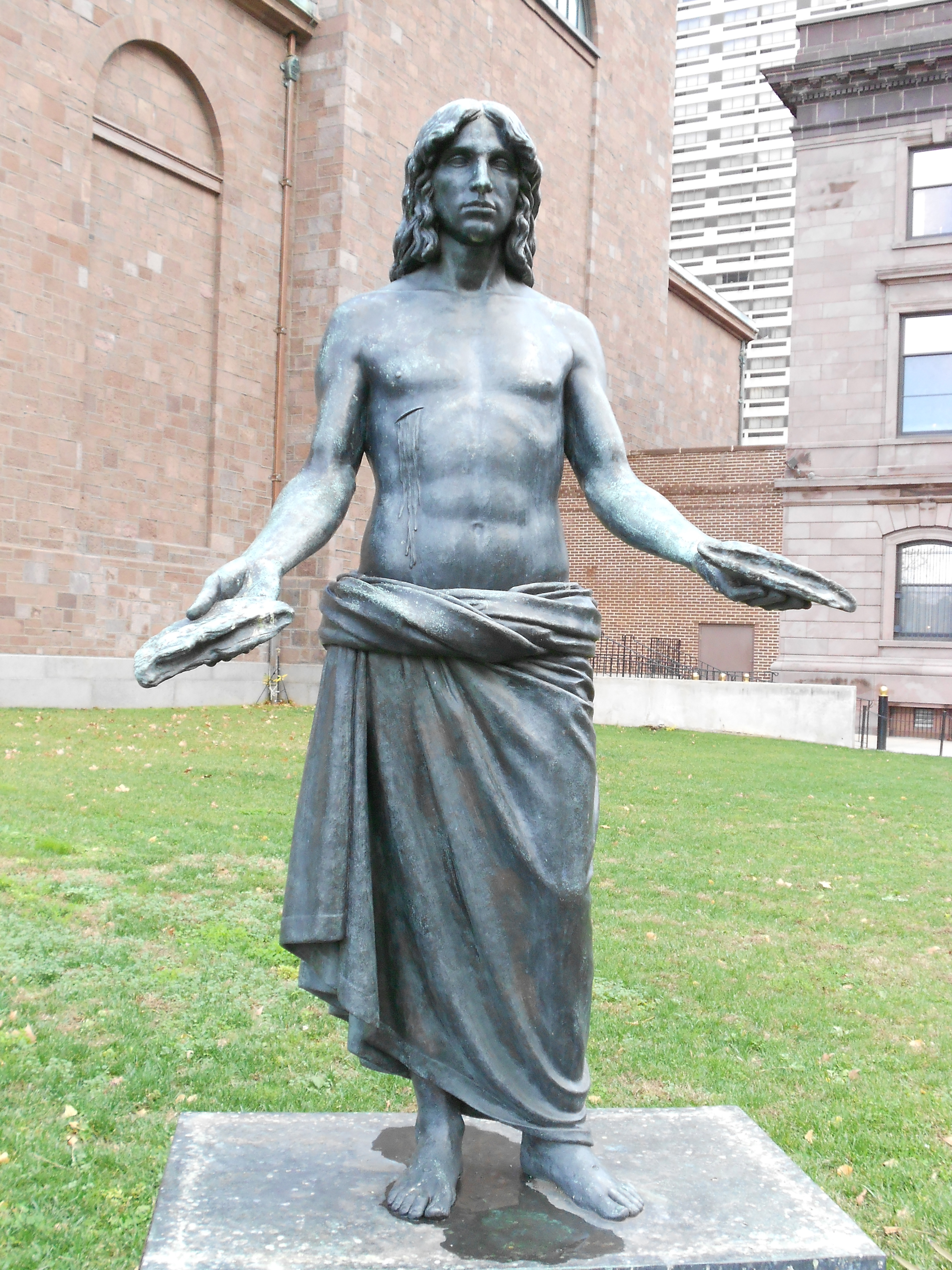
Jesus Breaking Bread

His public works of art include the bronze sculpture Jesus Breaking Bread, commissioned in 1976 for the Eucharistic Congress and located on the grounds of Cathedral Basilica of Saints Peters and Paul in Philadelphia, and two life size figures for the Dream Garden in the lobby of the ARA Tower.
