= Patricia Watwood =

American painter (born 1971)

Patricia Watwood (born 1971) is an American figurative painter living in Brooklyn, NY.

== Life ==
Patricia Watwood was born in 1971 in St. Louis, Missouri. Her father is Dr. Kenneth R. Smith, Jr., who was the founder and Director of the Division of Neurosurgery at St. Louis University Hospital. Watwood earned her BFA in Theatre Design from Trinity University in San Antonio, and her MFA in Painting from New York Academy of Art. She studied with Jacob Collins, and was a founding member of the Water Street Atelier. Her other teachers include Ted Seth Jacobs, Vincent Desiderio, Martha Mayer Erlebacher, Randy Mellick, and Steven Assael.

== Work ==
Watwood is a leading figure in the contemporary classical movement. She is a classical figurative oil painter who prioritizes aesthetic principles and technical rigor, balancing perception and design. Her subject matter is the figure, most commonly the nude, and uses allegory and mythology, often with contemporary urban settings. Her compositions unite a classical aesthetic with a modern sensibility. Arising out of the revived atelier movement, her compositions combine a modern color palette with academic draftsmanship and traditional painting techniques “with the intention of reinstating the role of beauty in art.”

In 2011-2012 St. Louis University Museum of Art, and The Forbes Galleries hosted Watwood’s solo museum exhibit, Patricia Watwood: Myths & Individuals. Her paintings were exhibited with the exhibit Contemporary American Realism, the first large presentation of American Realist paintings in China, at the Beijing World Art Museum. The tour traveled to Dalien, Tianjin, Hangzhou, Wuhan, and Shanghai throughout 2012 and 2013. Watwood is the Vice-President of the America China Oil Painting Artist’s League (ACOPAL), which helped organize the exhibit.

=== Public collections ===
- Harvard University
- St. Louis City Hall
- The Forbes Collection
- Weill-Cornell Medical College
- St. Louis University Medical School
