= Christopher Pugliese =

American painter

Christopher Pugliese is an American realist artist. He studied at the New York Academy of Art under Ted Jacobs and Tony Ryder. After that he continued his education as an artist at the Art Students League and the National Academy of Design both in New York City. He also studied privately in France with Seth Jacobs.

Pugliese's work has been exhibited at the Eleanor Ettinger, John Pence, Capro Nason, Arcadia, Hirschl and Adler and Bellwether galleries. In 2010 the New Britain Museum of American Art held of retrospective of his work as part of their "New/Now" series.

== Inspiration ==
The son of two modern artists Richard and Virginia Pugliese, Christopher grew up in Soho, NYC during the 1980s. Although surrounded by Modern Art objects, he was drawn instead to the paintings of the old masters, which had been out of fashion in the New York art world since the 1940s. Recently these works have begun to be reevaluated.

== Solo exhibitions ==
- 2016 The Fountain of Youth, Jean Nouvelle Building, New York City, NY
- 2015 New Years, Ahau Tulum, Tulum, Mexico
- 2015 Alaya Tulum, Tulum, Mexico
- 2014 A Private Affair, 35 Howard, New York City, NY
- 2011 Art Cube, Laguna Beach, CA
- 2010 New Britain Museum of American Art, New Britain, CT
- 2010 Shooting Gallery, San Francisco, CA
- 2007 Bruce Allen Gallery, Miami Beach, FL
- 2003 Arcadia Gallery, New York City, NY
- 2002 John Pence Gallery, San Francisco, CA
- 2001 Eleanor Ettinger Gallery, New York City, NY
- 1999 Eleanor Ettinger Gallery, New York City, NY

== Selected group exhibitions ==
- 2014 Arcadia Gallery, New York City, NY
- 2013 Corey Helford Gallery, Los Angeles
- 2013 Diego Salazar Gallery, New York City, NY
- 2013 Arcadia Gallery, New York City, NY
- 2013–2012 Contemporary American realism exhibition traveling in China:
- Beijing – 9/15/2012
- Dalian – 11/14/2012
- Tianjin – 1/23/2013
- Wuhan – 4/1/2013
- Hangzhou – 6/3/2013
- Shanghai – 7/3/2013
- 2012 Corey Helford Gallery, Los Angeles, CA
- 2011 National Arts Club, New York City, NY
- 2010 The Forbes Collection, New York City, NY
- 2009 Aqua Art Fair, Shooting Gallery, Miami Beach, FL
- 2008 Grenning Gallery, Sag Harbor, NY
- 2008 Copro Nason Gallery, Los Angeles, CA
- 2007 New York Academy of Art, Faculty exhibit, New York City, NY
- 2005 Idols of Perversity, Bellwether Gallery, New York City, NY
- 2003 The Arnot Museum, Elmira, NY
- 2003 Art Miami
- 2002 Art Chicago
- 2001 John Pence Gallery, San Francisco, CA
- Group Exhibition, Miami University, Chicago, Illinois
- Eleanor Ettinger Gallery, New York City, NY
- 1999 John Pence Gallery, San Francisco, CA
- Eleanor Ettinger Gallery, New York City, NY
- Albemarle Gallery, London, England
- 1997 American Artist, Methods and Materials Show, Pasadena, CA
- Eleanor Ettinger Gallery, New York City, NY
- 1996 The Society of Illustrators, New York City, NY
- 1995 Chuck Levitan Gallery, New York City, NY
- Revson Grant Exhibition, Lincoln Center, New York City, NY
- 1994 Emerging Artists 1994, Limner Gallery, New York City, NY
- 18th Annual Small Works Competition, Washington Square East Galleries, New York City, NY

== Collections ==
- Private Collection, Kathleen Kennedy
- Private Collection, Hans Hufschmid
- The Culver Academy, Huffington Library, Culver, IN
- Private Collection, Jerry & Rozelyn Meyer
- Private Collection, Michael Huffington
- Private Collection, Whoopie Goldberg
- The New Britain Museum of American Art, New Britain, CT
- Bowdoin College, Museum, ME

== Selected bibliography ==
- Christopher Pugliese, 1995–2010, hardcover publication, 120 pp,
- New Britain Museum of American Art, New/Now retrospective catalog, 2010
- Juxtapose Magazine, Interview, 2010
- Cover, American Art Collector, September 2006
- Spike, John T. “Closer Look.” Art & Antiques. January, 2005.
- Doherty, Stephen M. “Battle of the Muses.” American Artist. Deccmber, 2003:p46-53.
- Holland Cotter, “Fanciful to Figurative and Wryly Inscrutable” July 8th 2005 New York Times

== Awards ==
- 2007 The Roz & Jerry Meyer Grant for Young People in the Arts
- 1997 First Place, 60th Anniversary Art Competition, American Artist
- 1996 Third Place, 96 Art Competition, The Artist’s Magazine
- 1995 Elaine and James Hewett Memorial Award, Audubon Artists Show, National Arts Club
- 1993 Revson Grant, The Art Students League of New York
- First Place, Gallery North Oil Painting Competition, Setauket, New York
- Directors Award for Artistic Excellence, The American Artists’ Professional League,

== Education ==
- 1992–1993 The National Academy of Design, New York City, NY
- 1991–1993 The Art Students League of NY, New York City, NY
- 1986–1989 The University of the Arts, Philadelphia, PA
- 1986–1988 Summers, Ecole Albert Defois/Ted Seth Jacobs, Loire Valley, France
- 1986 The American Institute of Foreign Study, Florence, Italy
- 1984–1986 New York Academy of Art, New York City, NY
