= Klaudio Rodriguez =

- Born: 1971 (age 54–55); Nicaragua
- Education: University of Miami New World School of the Arts Florida International University (MA)

Klaudio Rodriguez is a Nicaraguan born American museum executive director known for his tenure at the Bronx Museum of Art, and who is executive director and CEO of the Museum of Fine Arts, St. Petersburg in St. Petersburg, Florida. He was appointed director in 2024 and has since led initiatives that have expanded the museum's profile, programs, and community presence.

== Early life and education ==
Klaudio Rodriguez was born in Managua, Nicaragua to a Croatian mother who was a social worker and a Nicaraguan father who was a lawyer. They relocated to Miami when he was six years old, following political turmoil.

He later attended the School of Architecture at the University of Miami and completed coursework in Graphic Design and Painting from the New World School of the Arts in Miami. Rodriguez holds a BA in Art History with a Minor in Photography, a Graduate certificate in Museum Studies, and an MA in Latin American and Caribbean Studies, specializing in modern and contemporary Latin American art from Florida International University.

== Career ==
Rodriguez began his career at the Patricia & Phillip Frost Art Museum at Florida International University in Miami, a Smithsonian Affiliate institution and one of the largest academic art museums in South Florida. From 2007 to 2010, he served as the museum's collections management assistant. He was promoted to chief curator in 2010, a position he held for nearly a decade. During his tenure as chief curator, Rodriguez oversaw the development of the museum's permanent collection, managed its research resources, and curated numerous exhibitions.

Following his tenure in Miami, Rodriguez joined the leadership team at the Bronx Museum of the Arts in New York City as deputy director, eventually serving as its executive director for seven years. In this executive capacity, he was responsible for directing the museum's strategic vision, overseeing educational and community outreach initiatives, and managing the permanent collection, research assets, and exhibition programming. Rodriguez departed from the institution during the initial phases of its $43 million capital renovation and expansion project.

Rodriguez joined the Museum of Fine Arts, St. Petersburg in October 2024, arriving during the two-week period between Hurricane Helene and Hurricane Milton. As the region prepared for mass evacuations ahead of Hurricane Milton, he assisted the museum staff in relocating artwork to higher elevations and volunteered to fill sandbags.

Under Rodriguez's leadership, the Museum of Fine Arts, St. Petersburg expanded its public art and campus programming to enhance community engagement. In March 2026, the museum installed Magic Grasshopper, a 30-foot sculpture by Chicago-based artist Yvette Mayorga, directly in front of the building's facade on Beach Drive. The public installation represented the initial phase of Rodriguez's long-term strategy to reexamine the role of the historic institution and integrate contemporary art into the surrounding urban landscape.

Following this installation, Rodriguez initiated a multi-phased master plan to redesign and re-imagine the museum’s physical campus. The initiative focuses on collaborating with architects to better integrate the museum's exterior spaces with the adjacent public parkland and waterfront. The long-term vision includes transitioning from temporary public art installations to acquiring permanent outdoor sculptural pieces, with the goal of creating a more accessible and physically engaging environment for the public.

In 2026, Rodriguez oversaw the presentation of Ali Banisadr: The Alchemist, the first major United States museum survey dedicated to Iranian-born contemporary artist Ali Banisadr. The exhibition encompassed nearly 20 years of the artist's practice, including paintings, drawings, prints, and bronze sculptures.

Rodriguez secured a loan from a local private collector to install one of Banisadr’s works directly within the museum's Renaissance galleries.
