= Watwood =

Watwood is a surname. Notable people with the surname include:

- Johnny Watwood (1905–1980), American baseball player
- Patricia Watwood (born 1971), American painter
