= Eliot Goldfinger =

- Notable work: Human Anatomy for Artists: The Elements of Form

Eliot Goldfinger is an artist known for his work with anatomy and his 1991 reference book Human Anatomy for Artists: The Elements of Form. He helped develop the anatomy program at the New York Academy of Art and several of his busts of the mayors of New York City are held in the Museum of the City of New York.

== Bibliography ==
- Human Anatomy for Artists: The Elements of Form (1991)
- Animal Anatomy for Artists (2004)
