= The Cycle of Terror and Tragedy =

Painting by Graydon Parrish

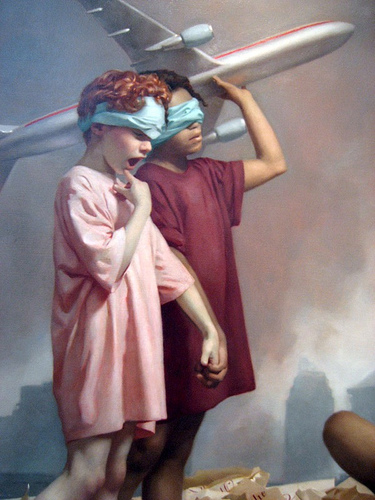
The Cycle of Terror and Tragedy (detail) by Graydon Parrish

The Cycle of Terror and Tragedy is a 2007 painting by Graydon Parrish.

== History ==
In 2002, Douglas Hyland, the director of the New Britain Museum of American Art, approached Graydon Parrish to create an allegorical tribute to victims of the September 11 attacks. The completed painting, The Cycle of Terror and Tragedy, is over 18 feet long and is one of the largest realist paintings ever created in America. Today it hangs in the Chase Wing of the New Britain Museum of American Art.

== Reception ==
The painting has been noted for its academic style, inspired both by Jacques-Louis David and William Bouguereau, and for its highly symbolic content, said to express the cycle of denial and tragedy. It has been compared and contrasted with Pablo Picasso's Guernica and Théodore Géricault's The Raft of the Medusa, both comments on catastrophes. Aimee Pozorski wrote that "In fact, it is true that what Parrish has created is a lovely and symmetrical allegory: The twin bodies--strong, virile, and painted as if part of a Botticelli painting--are also allegories for the virile twin towers about to fall. The children holding planes represent the loss of innocence of an entire nation."
