= Daniel Maidman =

American painter

- Born: 1975 (age 50–51); Canada
- Known for: Painting, art writing
- Website: www.danielmaidman.com

Daniel Maidman (born 1975) is a painter and art writer who lives in Brooklyn, New York. His art and writing reflect eclectic tastes, with an emphasis on realism.

== Early life and education ==
Paintings by Daniel Maidman

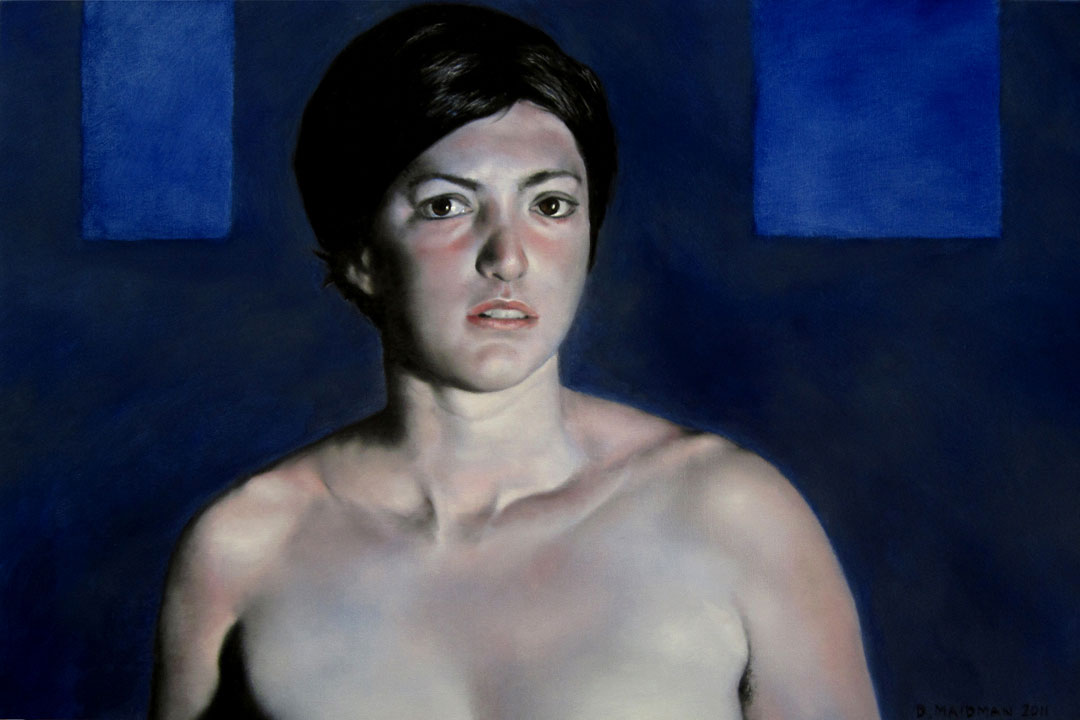
Blue Leah #2, part of a series exploring Form

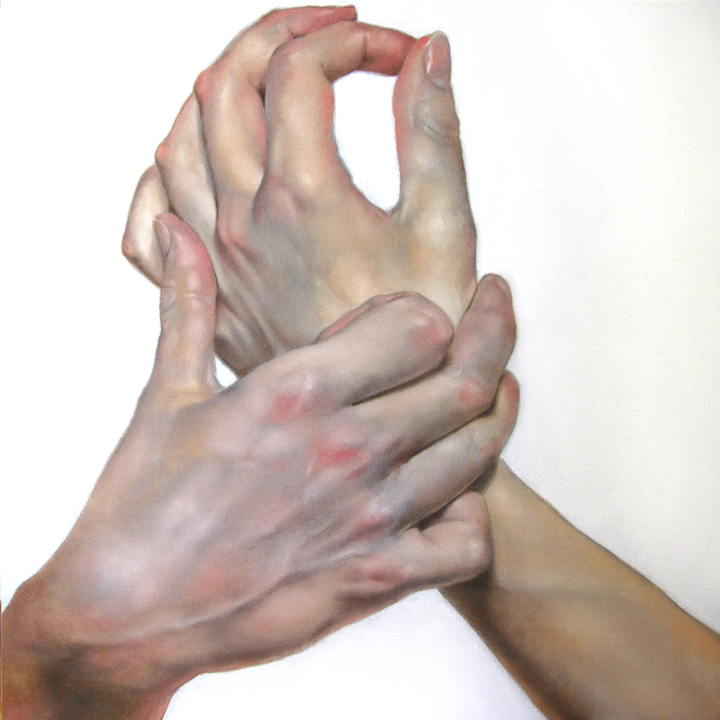
Part of a series on hands

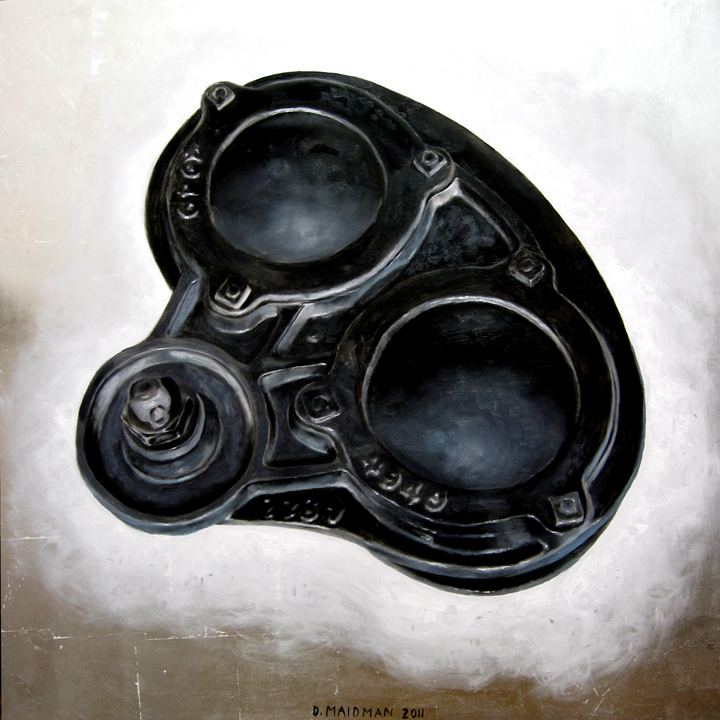
Industrial Object #2

Daniel Maidman was born in Toronto, Canada. He attended high school as a visual arts major at the Claude Watson School for the Arts, and completed a BA with honors in radio, television, and motion pictures at the University of North Carolina at Chapel Hill. He pursued extensive mentored independent study in gross anatomy at Santa Monica College, completing an anatomical atlas in 2003. Illustrations from this atlas were used in the United States Army's forensic field guide, Identification of Deceased Personnel. Maidman moved to Brooklyn in 2006, and continues to live and work there.

== Art ==
Maidman's paintings range from the figure and portraiture, to still lives and landscapes, to investigations of machinery, architecture, and microflora. The images occupy a spectrum from high rendering to almost total abstraction. His work has been shown in invitational and juried exhibitions in New York, Washington DC, California, Ohio, Missouri, and Oregon. His painting Hands #1 was selected by the Saatchi Gallery to be displayed at Gallery Mess in London. The work in his 2012 Manhattan solo show Blue Leah, at Dacia Gallery was reviewed as follows by The Huffington Post:

...we see the subject as a living, breathing human being. Maidman's paintings are not just portraits of Leah herself, but portraits of the painting process. While the depictions of Leah are naturalistic, there is an additional sense of slow, careful looking that brings an extra jolt of radiance to her body, reviving the mysteriousness of flesh...

— Priscilla Frank, Daniel Maidman's 'Blue Leah' Comes To Dacia Gallery, Huffington Post

He has produced work in collaboration with installation artist Erika Johnson, author Kathleen Rooney, and actor Martin Donovan. Several of Maidman’s life drawings, anatomical drawings, and Blue Leah paintings were shown at an invitational group show, The Anatomy of an Idea, at the Alden B. Dow Museum of Science and Art, in Midland, MI, in 2013. His paintings have repeatedly been finalists in the annual figurative painting competition of The Artist’s Magazine. His artwork has been published, among others, by Poets/Artists and Manifest. Maidman’s collectors include Chicago entrepreneur Howard A. Tullman, best-selling novelist China Miéville, and New York Magazine senior critic Jerry Saltz.

== Writing ==
Maidman has developed a large body of writing on art, ranging from technique and criticism to philosophy and aesthetics. He takes a broad approach to art styles and movements. While his focus is figurative painting, he seeks ways to read the work he encounters regardless of idiom. This latitudinarian attitude has earned his writing followings among both the academic and contemporary arts communities.

Maidman's writing on technique has appeared at Artist Daily and been extensively published in International Artist. His criticism and general art writing appears regularly at The Huffington Post. His writing and thoughts on art have also appeared in ARTnews, Whitehot Magazine, and MAKE Literary Magazine. His writing on Da Vinci was taught at DePaul University and Roosevelt University in 2012. In 2013, he was invited to moderate the graduating fellows panel at the New York Academy of Art.
