= Levan Songulashvili =

Georgian visual artist (born 1991)

- ლევან სონღულაშვილი
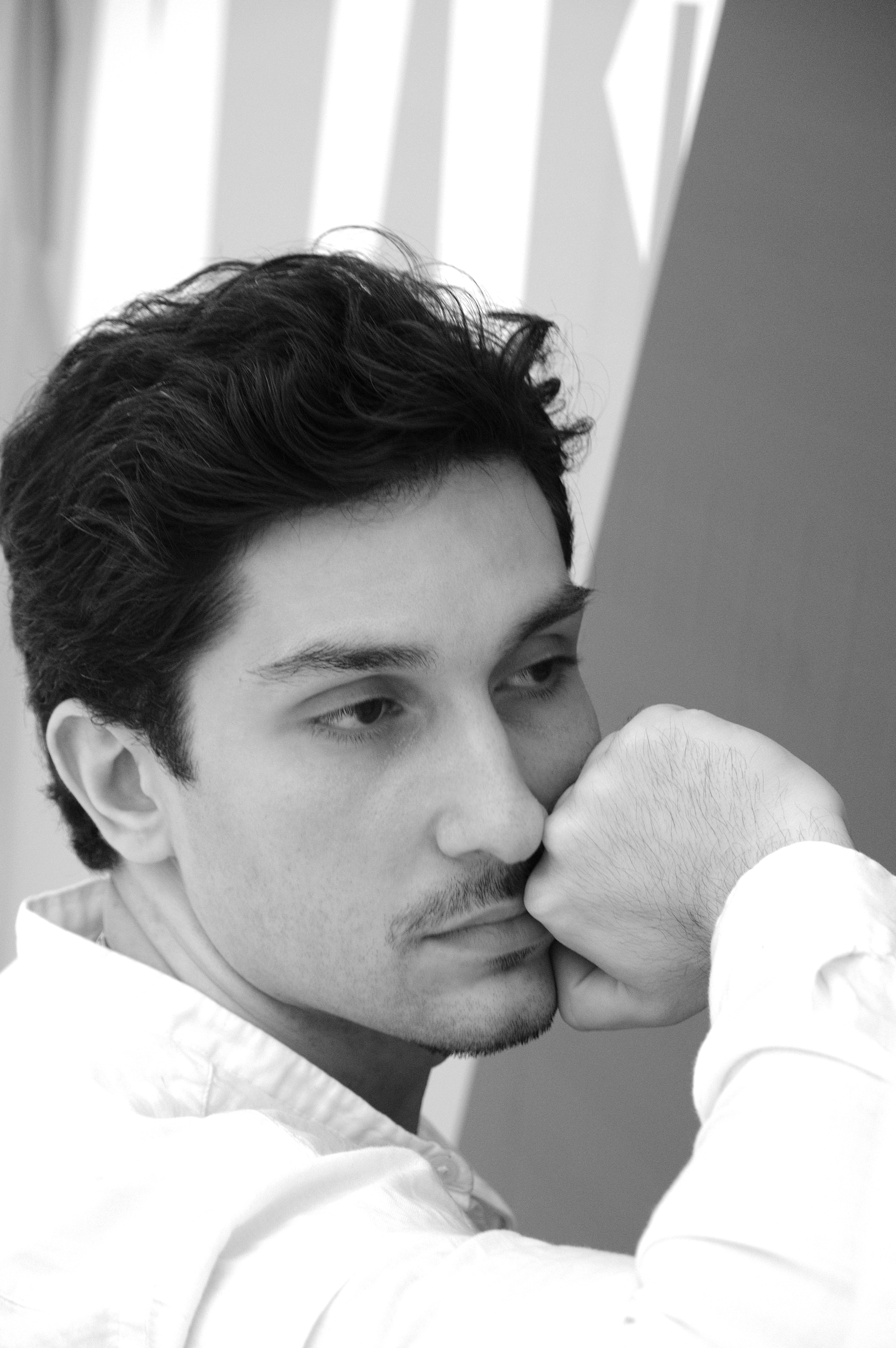
- Songulashvili in 2017
- Born: August 17, 1991 (age 35); Tbilisi, Georgia
- Education: Tbilisi State Academy of Arts; New York Academy of Art
- Known for: Painting; Drawing; Installation art
- Website: levan.gallery

Levan Songulashvili (Georgian: ლევან სონღულაშვილი; born August 17, 1991) is a Georgian-born visual artist.

== Early life and education ==
Songulashvili was born in Tbilisi, Georgia. He studied at the Tbilisi Academy of Arts. He later attended the New York Academy of Art and was listed among the participants in its 2017 MFA Thesis Exhibition.

== Career ==
In 2016, Songulashvili participated in Iggy Pop Life Class (a project by Jeremy Deller) connected to the Brooklyn Museum.

A multimedia solo exhibition titled Triptychos was hosted by the Georgian National Museum in 2021 (8 October–7 November).

== Collections ==
Works by Songulashvili are held in the Brooklyn Museum collection, including drawings from the Iggy Pop Life Class project. The Nun (2012) is listed by the Ajara Art Museum in its online collection materials.

== Recognition ==
A YARAT Contemporary Art Centre exhibition press page describes Songulashvili as a 2020 Forbes “30 Under 30” honoree.

== Selected publications ==
- Levan Songulashvili; Başak Şenova: Triptychos, Window Project (2021). ISBN 9789941838309
- Levan Songulashvili: Associo, Monograph (2020). ISBN 9789941810909
- Mark Gisbourne; Levan Songulashvili: The STYX, Erti (2018). ISBN 9789941800832
