= Museum of Fine Arts (St. Petersburg, Florida) =

Art museum in Florida, United States of America

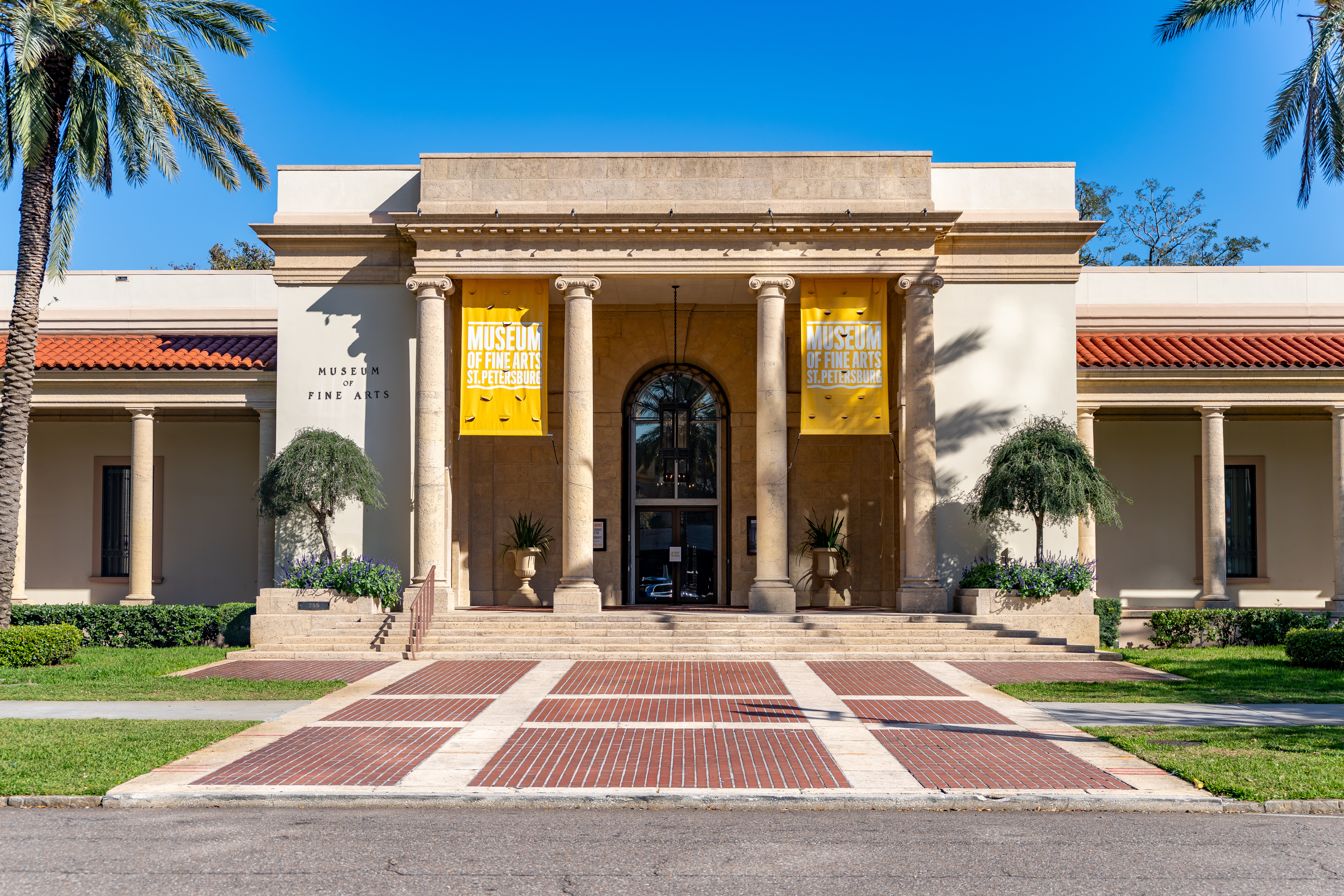

- Location within Florida
- Established: 1965
- Location: 255 Beach Drive NE; Saint Petersburg, Florida
- Coordinates: 27.77497°N 82.63221°W
- Type: Art
- Director: Klaudio Rodriguez
- Public transit access: downtown Looper Trolley
- Website: www.mfastpete.org

The Museum of Fine Arts, St. Petersburg is an art museum located in the Downtown Waterfront District in Saint Petersburg, Florida. It is the first museum in St. Petersburg and holds the largest collection of art in the Tampa Bay area. With over 20,000 objects spanning nearly 5,000 years of human history, the museum maintains the only comprehensive global collection on Florida's Gulf Coast. Klaudio Rodriguez has served as Executive Director and CEO since 2024.

== History ==
The Museum of Fine Arts (MFA) was founded in 1961 by art collector and philanthropist Margaret Acheson Stuart (1896–1980) and opened to the public in 1965. Stuart provided a $1 million endowment for artwork acquisition and operations, alongside donating key works from her personal collection. The Margaret Acheson Stuart Society, the museum's independent support organization, is named in her honor. The City of St. Petersburg provided the four-acre waterfront site for the construction of the original building, and The Junior League of St. Petersburg helped fund the construction of the Great Hall. The original building was designed by Palm Beach architect John Volk in a Neoclassical style featuring a curving colonnade along Beach Drive. Volk stated that "a museum should give a feeling of permanence and that is what I have tried to do with this building."

During the planning phase beginning in 1962, Stuart and the museum's founding director, Rexford Stead, maintained offices in a building located at 201 Beach Drive. This building previously housed the Art Club—later known as the Morean Arts Center—and served as the museum's temporary administration building. Following the completion of the main building in early 1965, the temporary structure was demolished. To commemorate the 50-year-old structure that had occupied the site, Stead planted a bombax tree on the south lawn, which remains on the grounds today, shortly after the museum opened.

The museum completed a major expansion with the opening of the Hazel Hough Wing Designed by Yann Weymouth of Hellmuth, Obata + Kassabaum (HOK), the 39,000-square-foot addition more than doubled the museum's footprint, adding new exhibition galleries, event spaces, and visitor amenities.

Situated along Straub Park overlooking Tampa Bay and the St. Pete Pier, the museum campus features a central Mediterranean-style courtyard, sculpture garden, and public outdoor display spaces designed to integrate the gallery experience with the waterfront setting.

== Permanent Collection ==
The museum houses a permanent collection of over 20,000 objects.

The museum houses a permanent collection with over 20,000 objects—the largest in the Tampa Bay area. Notable masters represented in the European and American collections include Claude Monet, Georgia O’Keeffe, Auguste Rodin, Elisabeth Louise Vigée Le Brun, Berthe Morisot, Thomas Moran, John Roddam Spencer Stanhope, Edward Steichen, Harold Edgerton, and Kehinde Wiley. The collection also contains an extensive selection of decorative art, featuring glasswork by Louis Comfort Tiffany.

The museum’s photography collection is recognized as one of the largest and most significant in the Southeastern United States, spanning the history of the medium from early daguerreotypes to contemporary photography. It features major works by Ansel Adams, Edward Steichen, Julia Margaret Cameron, Carrie Mae Weems, James Van Der Zee, and Aaron Siskind.

== Recent Exhibitions ==
The Museum of Fine Arts' presentations and exhibitions in the last five years include: Art of the Stage: Picasso to Hockney (2020), From Margins to Mainstays: Highlights from the Photography Collection (2021), Gio Swaby: Fresh Up (2022), True Nature: Rodin and the Age of Impressionism (2023), Claudia Pena Salinas: Ahua Can (2024), Kimono: The Triumph of Japanese Dress (2025), Ali Banisadr: The Alchemist, In Caravaggio’s Light: Baroque Masterpieces from the Fondazione Roberto Longhi (2025/26).

Exhibitions at the MFA have received coverage in national publications, including The New York Times, Artnet, Forbes, Harper’s Bazaar, and Vanity Fair.

== Operations and Leadership ==
In October 2024, Klaudio Rodriguez joined the Museum of Fine Arts, St. Petersburg and currently serves as executive director and CEO. Previously executive director at The Bronx Museum of Art, he has since led institutional initiatives that have expanded the museum's profile, programs, and community presence.

Under Rodriguez's leadership, the museum expanded its public art and campus programming to enhance community engagement. In March 2026, the museum installed Magic Grasshopper, a 30-foot sculpture by Chicago-based artist Yvette Mayorga, directly in front of the building's facade on Beach Drive. The public installation represented the initial phase of Rodriguez's long-term strategy to reexamine the role of the historic institution and integrate contemporary art into the surrounding urban landscape.

Following this installation, Rodriguez initiated a multi-phased master plan to reimagine the museum's permanent collection display and programming. The long-term vision includes thematically organized galleries—moving beyond traditional chronological and geographic frameworks—a new education gallery and studio classroom, and regular outdoor sculpture installations.
