= Maria Farmer =

American visual artist (b. 1969)

- Born: 1969 or 1970 (age 55–56); Paducah, Kentucky, US
- Education: Santa Clara University; New York Academy of Art
- Occupation: Visual artist
- Style: Figurative painter
- Website: MariaFarmerArt.com

Maria Kristine Farmer (born 1969 or 1970) is an American visual artist. She came to media attention in 2019 after she told reporters that in 1996, at the age of 26, she provided the first criminal complaint to the FBI about the conduct of financier and sex offender Jeffrey Epstein.

In 2002, Farmer described her and her sister's experiences with Epstein and Ghislaine Maxwell to a journalist at Vanity Fair. However, the publication elected not to include the allegation in the article, citing legal concerns.

In 2023, she announced plans to sue the U.S. government for $600 million, and filed her lawsuit in 2025.

== Early life ==
Farmer was born in 1969 or 1970 in Paducah, Kentucky, to Frank Farmer and Janice Swain. She has two younger brothers and two younger sisters. The family lived for a time in Phoenix, Arizona. From an early age, she had a set intention to become an artist.

Farmer attended Santa Clara University and graduated in 1992. She relocated to New York City in 1993 to study at the New York Academy of Art, and earned her master's degree in 1995. Farmer attended a post-graduate workshop at the Santa Fe Art Institute in 1995.

== Early career and association with Epstein ==
Farmer is a visual artist who primarily makes figurative paintings and pastel drawings of individual people or groups of people. In the mid-1990s, she attended the New York Academy of Art (NYAA), and reported selling her artwork for $20,000 out of her studio. Farmer says she was aware Epstein was an important arts patron at the academy, and that he attended events and observed art students working in their studios. Epstein served as a board member at the Academy from 1987 to 1994.

Farmer recalled meeting Jeffrey Epstein at her graduate exhibition in 1995. She said that NYAA dean Eileen Guggenheim introduced her to Epstein, and his companion Ghislaine Maxwell. According to Farmer, she had already sold her painting for $12,000 to a German buyer, however Epstein wanted to buy it at the reception for half price, and Guggenheim urged Farmer to cut him a deal, saying "you are going to make them happy. Do you understand?". Guggenheim denied that this occurred, stating: "Farmer's claims against Eileen Guggenheim are inconsistent with her sworn testimony and filings in two federal court actions, in which Farmer herself states that she negotiated the sale of the painting to Epstein, and that she did so herself because Epstein offered to help her career".

In the summer of 1995, Farmer was one of four artists chosen to attend an NYAA all-expenses-paid trip to Santa Fe, New Mexico. In 2019, Farmer and another artist alleged that during the 1995 trip, a dinner party was hosted by Epstein, Maxwell and Eileen Guggenheim at Epstein's home on Zorro Ranch, and that Epstein tested artists with unusual tasks and promised to reward one with a commission. Farmer alleged that Guggenheim told her to "act grateful and tell [Epstein] how wonderful he is".

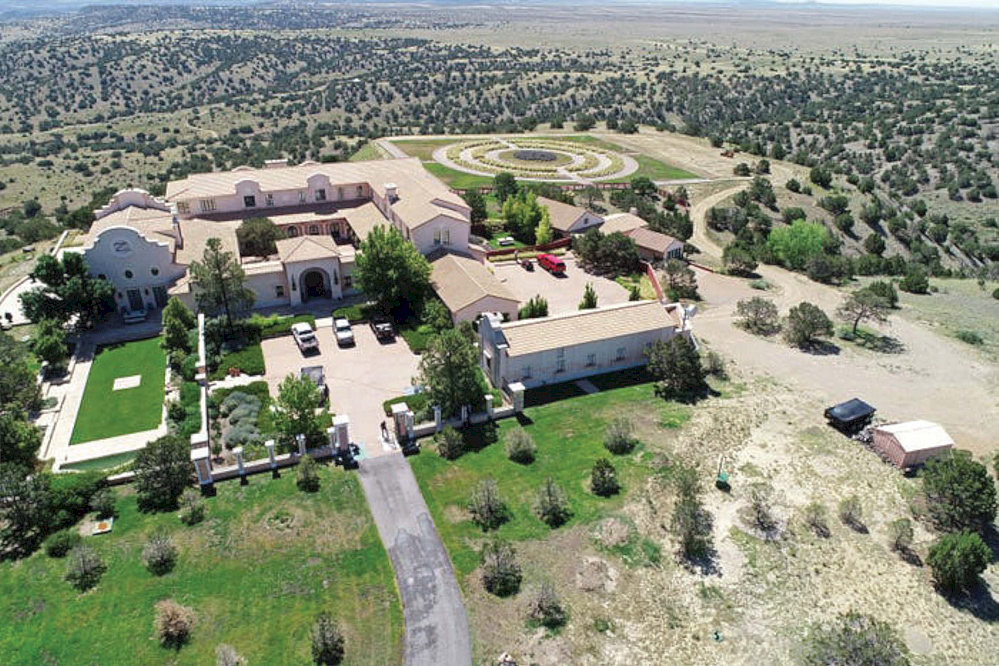
Epstein's Zorro Ranch in New Mexico.

Artnet News reported in June 2020 that Farmer's allegations prompted the New York Academy of Art to solicit an investigation from a law firm. Their report stated "Farmer has characterized the visit to Epstein’s ranch as a ‘dinner party' ... However, evidence supports that the visit occurred during the daytime." It further claimed "a number of these allegations are contradicted by Farmer’s own sworn statements, as well as by other witness testimony."

In protest, several female board members resigned, and some students and alumni criticized the investigation as victim blaming. In August 2020, the NYAA issued a "profound apology" to Farmer.

Epstein hired Farmer to work as an art advisor and property manager for his New York residence. She oversaw the acquisition of artwork by Chuck Bowdish and Damian Loeb for Epstein's collection. She continued to work for Epstein at the front desk of his New York mansion, signing in "tradesmen, decorators, and friends". In 2019, Farmer said she observed a large number of young girls coming and going from the house, and said that Maxwell would leave on frequent missions to recruit girls for Epstein. She alleges that Epstein showed her the security room at his New York mansion that was equipped with extensive video surveillance devices focused on the beds and toilets in the property. Farmer alleged seeing lawyer Alan Dershowitz regularly visiting Epstein's New York home. Dershowitz contends that Farmer "provably lied" about seeing him, stating that he did not meet Epstein until August 1996.

== Wexner artist residency and alleged assault ==
In the summer of 1996, Farmer was commissioned to create two large-scale paintings for the film set of As Good as It Gets. At the time, she was living in a small apartment in Greenwich Village. Epstein offered her more space to create the artwork as an artist-in-residence at a (10,600 sq. ft.) guest home on Les Wexner's property in New Albany, Ohio. In May 1996, Farmer traveled to the Wexner property in Ohio. Farmer said she found the property to be spacious, but was "disturbed" that the home was guarded by Wexner's armed security personnel and that she was required to call Wexner's wife, Abigail, for permission to leave the property.

Farmer stated, in an affidavit filed in support of a defamation lawsuit brought by Virginia Giuffre against Alan Dershowitz, that Epstein and Maxwell came to the property in Ohio and sexually assaulted her. She said that she escaped into another part of the house and barricaded herself inside by pushing furniture up against the door. Farmer called members of her family, her mentor artist Eric Fischl, and reached out to authorities. Security guards on the property reportedly told her that she could not leave and she was held against her will for 12 hours. Farmer was eventually able to depart the scene when her father arrived, after driving from Kentucky to Ohio, to pick her up.

Shortly after she left the New Albany property in August 1996, Farmer says she learned that her younger sister Annie said she had also been assaulted by Epstein in April when she visited him at his Zorro Ranch in New Mexico. In a lawsuit filed in 2019 against Epstein's estate, Annie Farmer stated that Epstein had groped, harassed, and crawled into bed with her in New Mexico, and Maxwell had given her an inappropriate topless massage. During the 2021 trial of Ghislaine Maxwell, a judge determined that Annie's allegations about Epstein and Maxwell did not constitute "illegal sexual activity", but jurors could consider her testimony.

Farmer had called the Sixth Precinct of the New York City Police Department in August 1996. The NYPD referred her to the FBI because the incident was out of state. Farmer says she reported the sexual assault and the child sexual abuse material allegations in two calls to two different offices, alleging that authorities took no action.

Farmer's complaint to the FBI, listed under child pornography, was released as part of the Epstein Files in 2025. It was handwritten in FBI paperwork and dated September 3, 1996:

Complainant stayed [sic] that she is professional artist and took pictures of her sisters 12 and 16 yrs for her own personnel [sic] art work. Epstein stole the photos and negatives and is believed to have sold the pictures to potential buyers. Epstein at one time requested [redacted] to take pictures of young girls at swimming pools. Epstein is now threatening [redacted] that if she tells anyone about the photos he will burn her house down.

In 2002, Farmer, her sister, and her mother shared their stories with journalist Vicky Ward, then at Vanity Fair, who was writing a profile on Epstein. Their mention was excluded from the final story by then-editor Graydon Carter in 2003. In 2019, Carter alleged that he had been pressured by Epstein at the time of publication to omit mention of the Farmer sisters; and claimed that a bullet and a dead cat were found outside his home. However, Carter later recalled that the bullet appeared in 2004, not in 2003 when the Epstein article was under review.

In 2019, art collector Stuart Pivar, and artist Eric Fischl told reporters they were told about Farmers experience with Epstein.

== Life in hiding ==
In 2019, Farmer alleged that Maxwell repeatedly threatened her life after the 1996 assault. She said this intensified after the 2003 Vanity Fair profile, leading her to leave the New York art world. Farmer said she received multiple direct threats from Maxwell and Epstein, who reportedly called her clients and contacts in the art world in an effort to destroy her credibility. She stated: "I was terrified of Maxwell and Epstein and I moved a number of times to try to hide from them."

Farmer has said she was forced to change her name, and moved to the American Southeast where she sold antiques and restored houses to stay under the radar. Farmer said she stopped painting for twenty years as a result, only resuming her artwork in 2019.

In 2006, Maria Farmer was a contributing artist in the New York Academy of Art "Take Home a Nude" art benefit auction.

According to Farmer, in 2006 the FBI came to her door to question her just before Epstein's arrest for his first criminal prosecution, but she says little came of the matter. Farmer was contacted once more in 2016, this time by lawyers who were working with Virginia Giuffre. Still in hiding, Farmer recounted her experiences with Epstein and Maxwell to Stanley Pottinger and Bradley Edwards to assist in a better understanding of the defendants' patterns over time.

== Decision to speak out publicly ==
External videos
- The first person to report Jeffrey Epstein and Ghislaine Maxwell to the FBI; 5:27 video from 60 Minutes Australia July 2020
- Right Hand Woman; 27:21 video from 60 Minutes Australia July 2020 (Farmer's interview starts at 4:50)

After being diagnosed with a brain tumor by early 2019, Farmer described her realization and anger over the impact that the abuse (plus the years of hiding after threats to her life) had on her and her family as the impetus for speaking out publicly. On April 16, 2019, Farmer filed a sworn affidavit in federal court in New York, alleging that she and her sister, Annie, had been sexually assaulted by Epstein and Maxwell in separate locations in 1996.

In an interview with Grazia in September 2019, Farmer expressed that it was the betrayal by women that she found hardest to bear in addition to the lack of interest with which the authorities handled her early reports of abusive behavior by Epstein and Maxwell. In November 2019, Farmer was also interviewed by Anthony Mason for CBS This Morning.

ABC News reported that Farmer and her younger sister Annie Farmer shared similarities with Chauntae Davies and her younger sister Teala Davies in that Epstein manipulated the trust within both family groups to further his criminal interest in abusing young girls.

In late 2019 and early 2020, five victims in the Ohio State University abuse scandal called on state and federal officials to conduct further inquiry into Farmer's allegations of sexual assault at the Wexner property.

Farmer appeared in a four-part Netflix series, released in May 2020, Jeffrey Epstein: Filthy Rich, directed by Lisa Bryant and based on the earlier book of the same name by James Patterson.

== Later artwork ==
In late 2019, Farmer resumed creating artwork after more than twenty years away from her art practice. She began working on a series of paintings and pastel drawings called The Survivors Project consisting of individual portraits of known survivors of Epstein's abuse. She believes the harm experienced by countless other victims of Epstein could have been prevented had authorities acted when she first reported the abuse.

Farmer created a seven foot long artwork on canvas about the Epstein abuse network titled The Setiles, 2020, which portrayed individuals involved in the scandal in a style akin to Hieronymus Bosch. In The Setiles, Kate Briquelet of the Daily Beast described Farmer's depiction of some of Epstein's associates as "murderous lizard people" whereas some of the "victims’ lawyers who fought for justice" were illustrated as cherubs.

== Lawsuit against the federal government ==
In July 2023, Farmer and Sarah Ransome filed a notice of claim to sue the U.S. government for $600 million.

In May 2025, Farmer filed a lawsuit in the U.S. District Court for the District of Columbia against the federal government accusing the Justice Department, U.S. Attorney's Offices, and the FBI of negligence and negligent infliction of emotional distress for failing to protect her and other victims of Epstein.

== Personal life ==
After being diagnosed with a brain tumor and non-Hodgkin lymphoma, she was receiving treatment for cancer in May 2020.
