= Gio Swaby =

Bahamian textile artist

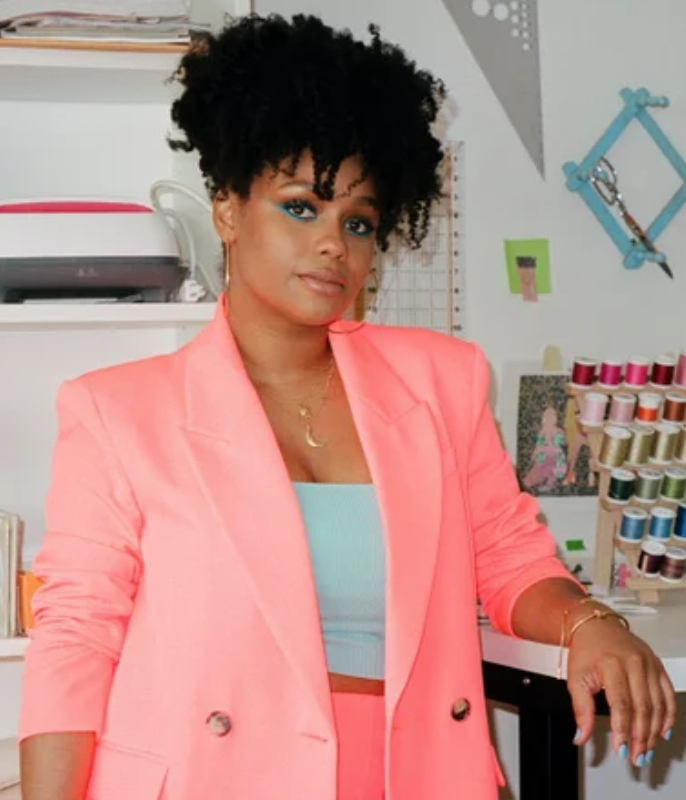
- Born: September 9, 1991 (age 35)
- Education: OCAD University Emily Carr University of Art and Design The University of The Bahamas
- Website: gioswaby.com

Gio Swaby (born Giovanna Swaby in 1991) is a Bahamian textile artist who grew up in Nassau, Bahamas. She currently lives and practices in Toronto, Ontario.

Swaby is well known for her textile portraits and silhouettes' which she has created as "a love letter to Black women". Her works are included in the permanent collections of the Art Institute of Chicago, the Museum of Fine Arts Boston among others.

== Early life and education ==
Gio Swaby grew up in Nassau, Bahamas, with three older sisters and one younger brother. They were raised by their mother who was a seamstress. As a child, Swaby was taught how to sew clothes for her dolls by her mother. Her mother became a direct influence on her approach to art and creation.

Swaby first studied art at the College of the Bahamas, before moving to Vancouver, Canada to attend Emily Carr University of Art and Design. In 2016, she graduated with a Bachelor of Fine Arts in Film, Video and Integrated Media.

In 2022, she completed a Master of Fine Arts degree at OCAD University.

== Media reception ==
Swaby was featured in the September 2022 edition of Essence magazine. Additionally, the Oprah Winfrey Network (OWN) featured Swaby's work in its "Juneteenth Artist Showcase".

== Exhibitions ==
Swaby's first solo museum exhibition Gio Swaby: Fresh Up! was co-organized by the Museum of Fine Arts, Saint Petersburg and the Art Institute of Chicago.

Gio Swaby: Fresh Up! first opened at the Museum of Fine Arts, St. Petersburg, Florida on May 28, 2022, and was scheduled to run until October 9, 2022, however, due to hurricane Ian, the exhibition was closed one week early on October 2, 2022. Gio Swaby: Fresh Up! is set to open at the Art Institute of Chicago on April 9, 2023.

On April 12, 2022, a monograph of her work was published by Rizzoli Electa to coincide with her first solo museum opening. It includes an exclusive interview between Swaby and Pulitzer Prize winner, Nicole Hannah-Jones.

In 2022, she also exhibited at EXPO Chicago and her work was written about in the Chicago Sun Times.

== Public collections ==
- Art Institute of Chicago, Illinois
- Museum of Fine Arts, Boston, Massachusetts
- Museum of Fine Arts, Saint Petersburg, Florida
- Harper House, Detroit, Michigan
- Weisman Art Museum, Minneapolis, Minnesota
- Minneapolis Institute of Art, Minnesota

== Solo exhibitions ==
- "Gio Swaby: Fresh Up!" Museum of Fine Arts, St. Petersburg, Florida – 2022
- "Both Sides of The Sun" Claire Oliver Gallery, New York, New York – 2021
- "We All Know Each Other" Unitt/ Pitt Projects, Vancouver, British Columbia – 2017
