= Stuart Pivar =

American art collector

- Born: 1930 (age 95–96); New York City, U.S.
- Education: Hofstra University
- Occupations: Art collector, chemist
- Known for: Chemtainer Industries; New York Academy of Art

Stuart Pivar (born 1930) is an American chemist and art collector. Trained as a scientist, Pivar has long endorsed the study of anatomy and need for artists to acquire technical skills. He grew his fortune in the plastics industry and is also the author of several books. Pivar is one of the founders of the New York Academy of Art with, among others, Andy Warhol.

== Early life ==
Stuart Pivar was born 1930 in Brooklyn, New York to a father who imported velvet ribbons and a mother known for being "intensely style-conscious". Pivar speaks Yiddish and was brought up in a Jewish family. He began collecting objects at age 7, starting with insects in Central Park, and later bottle caps on Kings Highway at age 8. He spent time at a summer camp in Kingston, New York. Pivar attended Brooklyn Technical High School before going on to earn a B.Sc in chemistry at Hofstra University, graduating in 1951.

== Career ==
In 1959, Pivar founded Chemtainer Industries, a business that specialized in bulk-storage plastic containers. As an inventor, he made a large fortune in plastics. While remaining active in the plastics industry, he became an independently wealthy investor and buyer on the art scene.

=== New York Academy of Art ===
Pivar endorsed the reintroduction of traditional skills into art school curricula, including the study of human and animal anatomy. With Warhol, he helped to found the New York Academy of Art in 1980, becoming one of its board members. The academy opposed abstract art and promoted traditional skills. According to Eliot Goldfinger, Pivar "strongly supported the acquisition of an anatomical collection of comparative skeletons, related artwork, anatomical models and charts, and the use of dissection as part of the curriculum." He donated over $1.2 million to the Academy during his involvement with it.

Pivar resigned from the Academy in 1994 and complained that he had been "lied to and outmaneuvered" by other senior figures at the institution. A report placed most of the blame on his "disruptive, angry and abusive" behavior for problems at the institution. Pivar attempted to sue the Academy for $50 million, claiming that he had been caused "emotional and mental distress" and that he had been ostracised for pointing out falsification of financial records and employment of illegal immigrants. Pivar has stated that he resigned from the Academy Board along with Caroline Newhouse.

=== Biological theories ===
Beginning with his book Lifecode in 2004 Pivar has published novel claims about the evolution of species. He asserts that the body form of species are encoded not in DNA but in the patterned structure of a primordial germ plasm. However, critics have stated that Pivar's proposed developmental sequences bear no resemblance to anything actually observed during embryological development. In his book on the demarcation problem, Nonsense on Stilts, Massimo Pigliucci says that he and his graduate students received "more or less threatening" emails from Pivar complaining that his non-novel theory (written in quotes) of form was not being taken seriously. On his blog "Pharyngula", developmental biologist PZ Myers reviewed Lifecode and concluded that it was "a description of the development and evolution of balloon animals". In 2007, Pivar attempted to sue Seed Media, whose ScienceBlogs hosted "Pharyngula", for describing him as "classic crackpot", but the case was withdrawn after ten days.

On July 5, 2016 a scientific paper titled The Origin of the Vertebrate Body Plan in the Geometric Patterns in the Embryonic Blastula was published in the peer-reviewed journal Progress in Biophysics and Molecular Biology identifying Stuart Pivar as the principal investigator.

== Personal life ==
At The Factory in the early 1970s, Pivar met Andy Warhol who became one of his closest longtime friends. With Warhol he would go on regular shopping trips to buy "masterpieces", which could be objects bought anywhere, from a high-end auction house to a fleamarket. After the artist's death in 1987, Pivar recalled that "Andy Warhol loved to buy art. We used to go shopping together for it for a few hours practically every day in the past couple of years."

Pivar was also a well-known friend of the late financier Jeffrey Epstein. Pivar said the friendship ended after Maria Farmer, the first person to report Epstein's crimes to law enforcement, informed him personally of the abuse. Farmer made her formal allegations in 1996 and also spoke to Pivar about the abuse at that time. She had graduated from the New York Academy of Art the previous year. Nonetheless, in 2003 Pivar wrote a note for Jeffrey Epstein's birthday book, containing a limerick with the lines "Jeffrey at half century, with credentials plenipotentiary, though up to no good whenever he could, has avoided the penitentiary." Epstein and his associate Ghislaine Maxwell were board members of Seed Media Group when Pivar sued it in 2007.

=== Art collection ===
Pivar is a life long art collector. He was a collector of 19th-century academic art at a time when it was unfashionable. A scholar of the work of the sculptor Antoine-Louis Barye, he wrote "The Barye Bronzes: A Catalogue Raisonne" in 1974, a collation of critical commentary on all the sculptor's known works.

== Publications ==
- Edelman, D.B.; McMenamin, M.; Sheesley, P.; Pivar, S. (2016). "Origin of the vertebrate body plan via mechanically biased conservation of regular geometrical patterns in the structure of the blastula". Progress in Biophysics and Molecular Biology. 121 (3): 212–244. doi:10.1016/j.pbiomolbio.2016.06.007. PMID 27392530.
- Pivar, S. (2011). "The origin of the vertebrate skeleton". International Journal of Astrobiology. 10 (1): 45–65. Bibcode:2011IJAsB..10...45P. doi:10.1017/s147355041000025x. S2CID 85073679.
- Pivar, S. (2009). On the Origin of Form. North Atlantic Books.
- Pivar, S. (2004). Lifecode. Ryland Press.
- Pivar, S. (1974). The Barye Bronzes. Antique Collectors' Club.
