= Ali Banisadr =

Iranian artist

- Born: 1976 (age 49–50); Tehran, Iran
- Education: New York School of Visual Arts, New York Academy of Art
- Website: alibanisadr.com

Ali Banisadr (born 1976), is an Iranian-born American artist from New York City working primarily with oil painting and also with printmaking. Banisadr was ranked #1 in Flash Art's Top 100 Artists of 2011.

== Early life and career ==
Banisadr was born in Tehran. When he was twelve, he and his family moved to San Diego, in the United States. He moved to New York in 2000 to study a Bachelor of Fine Arts at the School of Visual Arts, and for a Master of Fine Arts at the New York Academy of Art.

In an interview with The Met, New York Banisadr said he is influenced by childhood memories of growing up in Tehran during the Iran-Iraq war and the Islamic Revolution. He compares his work to Hieronymus Bosch and other figurative artists whose work revolve around dynamism and conflict. Banisadr said his synesthesia greatly affects his paintings, imbuing a sense of sound and vitriol.

Banisadr has often said that his work is always a combination of personal history, art history and history of our time.

He has held solo museum exhibitions at Het Noordbrabants Museum in Den Bosch, Holland, Bosch and Banisadr at Academy of fine arts in Vienna, Austria, The Benaki Museum, Athens, Greece, Matrix 185 at Wadsworth Atheneum Museum, Hartford, CT and the Katonah Museum of Art in Katonah, New York.

From April 11, 2026 through July 12, 2026, the Museum of Fine Arts, St. Petersburg exhibited Ali Banisadr: The Alchemist, the first museum survey of Banisadr's work.

== Public collections ==
Banisadr's work is represented in the museum collections of Albright- Knox Art Gallery, Buffalo, The British Museum in London, The Metropolitan Museum of Art in New York City, Los Angeles's Museum of Contemporary Art, Centre Georges Pompidou, Paris, Los Angeles County Museum of Art, Wadsworth Atheneum, Philadelphia Museum of Art, The artist also features in private collections such as The Olbricht Collection in Germany, Francois Pinault Foundation in Italy, London's The Saatchi Gallery, Vienna's Sammlung Essl, and The Wurth Collection in Germany.
