= Martha Mayer Erlebacher =

American painter (1937–2013)

- Self Portrait, 2011, Nero pencil on paper
- Born: November 21, 1937; Jersey City, New Jersey
- Died: June 22, 2013 (aged 75); Elkins Park, Pennsylvania
- Known for: Painting
- Spouse: Walter S. Erlebacher

Martha Mayer Erlebacher (November 21, 1937 – June 22, 2013) was an American painter. She attended Gettysburg College from 1955 to 1956. She received a BA in Industrial Design from the Pratt Institute. She also received an MFA from Pratt in 1963. She is known for her trompe-l'œil still lifes and well as her representational figurative work of the nude body. She was influenced by eighteenth- and nineteenth-century Italian and French painting traditions and well as by the realist Thomas Eakins.

As a leading American realist artist, she has exhibited her work over the past four decades at renowned art galleries in New York, Chicago, and Philadelphia.

Erlebacher's work was used on the cover of The Figure: Painting Drawing and Sculpture, Contemporary Perspectives (2014).

== Notes and references ==
- Cozzolino, Robert, ed. (2012). The Female Gaze: Women Artists Making Their World. Pennsylvania Academy of the Fine Arts. ISBN 978-1-55595-389-8.
- Plous, Phyllis (1983). A Heritage Renewed: Representational Drawing Today. University Art Museum. ISBN 978-0-942006-03-2.
