= New Britain Museum of American Art =

Coordinates: 41.6643°N 72.7917°W

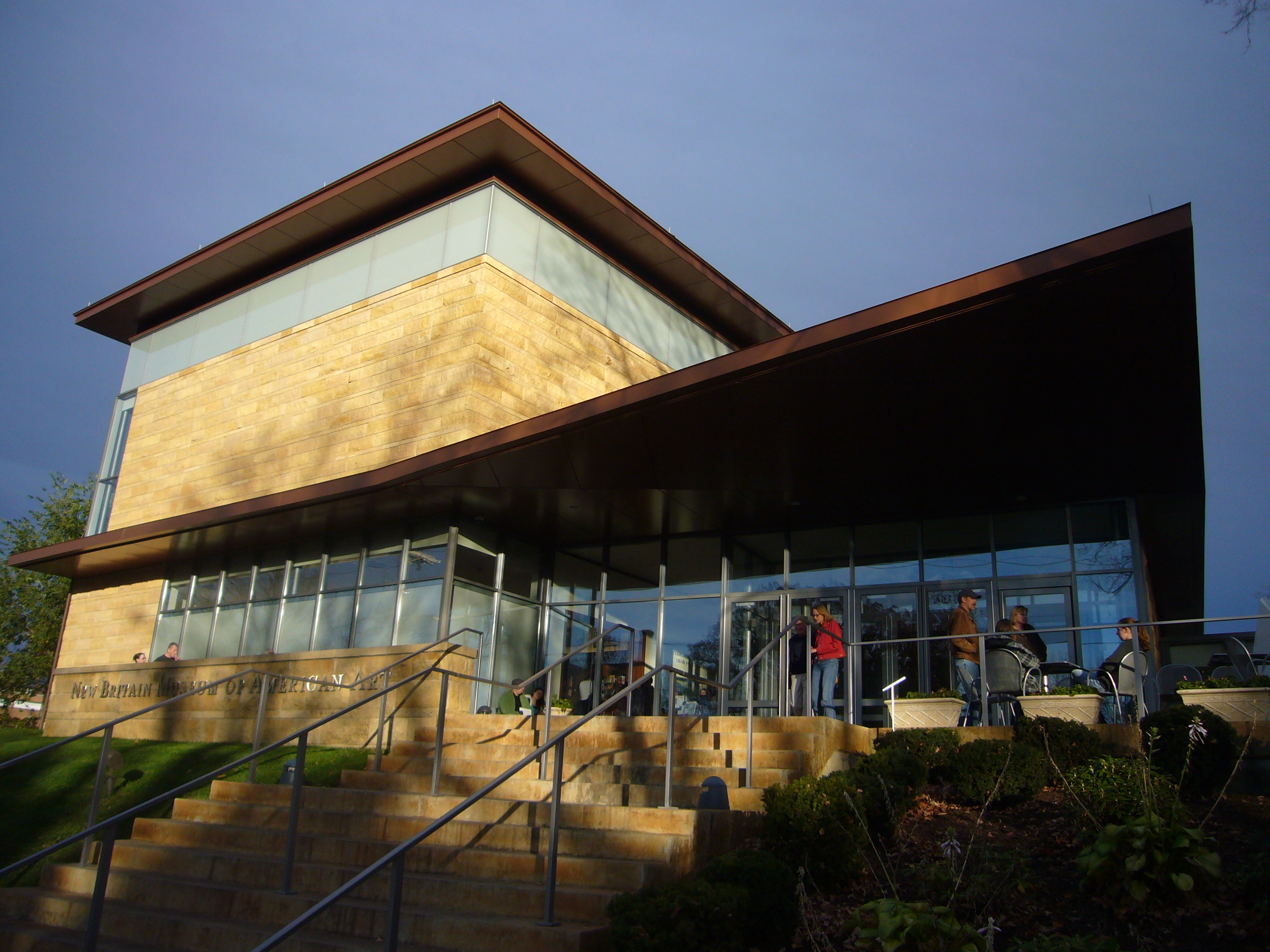
- Chase Family Building; New Britain Museum of American Art
- Established: 1903
- Location: 56 Lexington Street; New Britain, Connecticut, Connecticut, United States
- Type: Art museum
- Website: nbmaa.org

The New Britain Museum of American Art is an art museum in New Britain, Connecticut. Founded in 1903, it is the first museum in the country dedicated to American art.

Walnut Hill Park, designed by Frederick Law Olmsted, is next to the museum.

== History ==
The museum's origins are in the "New Britain Institute," chartered in 1853 with the goal of fostering education and art in the city, especially among its immigrant population. In 1903, the museum received a bequest of $20,000 from John Butler Talcott to acquire "original modern oil paintings either by native or foreign artists". Talcott's nephew was tonalist Allen Butler Talcott of the Old Lyme Art Colony. Bryson Burroughs, then curator of paintings at the Metropolitan Museum of Art in New York City, suggested to museum officials that directing their efforts at acquiring American art would be most cost-effective. The museum took his advice and seldom spent more than $1,000 for any artwork, amassing a collection now worth millions.

A wealthy widow, Grace Judd Landers, expected to donate a large amount of money to the museum, but she lost her money in the stock market crash of 1929, and so donated her house as a museum in 1934.

Sanford B. D. Low, a son-in-law of William H. Hart, at one time president of New Britain's Stanley Works, was the museum's first Director. He acquired a number of works by his friend, Thomas Hart Benton, for the museum. Both Low and Benton were part of a high-spirited circle of friends (including James Cagney) who spent summers at Hart Haven, William Hart's summer place on Martha's Vineyard where both Low and Benton painted together (Hart was no relation to Thomas Hart Benton). In the late 1940s, Low found out that the Whitney Museum in New York City was rumored to be ready to sell Benton's "The Arts of Life in America" series, which was out of fashion as representational art. Benton had believed he was cheated when he sold the murals to the Whitney's director, Juliana Force. Low arranged to have the New Britain museum acquire the works for $500, paid for by Alix Stanley, a member of the family which founded Stanley Works. The purchase price was less than it cost to hire a crane for the move and transport the pictures.

In 1964, the Sanford B. D. Low Memorial Illustration Collection was inaugurated. The first museum collection of American illustration in the United States, it now holds over 1,700 works dating from the 19th century.

Douglas Hyland became Executive Director of the museum in 1999 after having been director of the San Antonio Museum. He raised funds from new donors outside of New Britain, including the Walton Family Foundation and the Henry Luce Foundation. In 2003, the 43,000-square-foot (4,000 m^{2}) Chase Family Building was constructed, doubling the museum's size. During Hyland's tenure, the New Britain museum building was renovated, and the museum doubled its collection, doubled its full-time staff to 24 employees, doubled its docents to 100, and nearly tripled memberships from 1,200 to 3,500.

In 2015, Min Jung Kim became the second female and first immigrant Executive Director of the NBMAA. During her tenure, (2015-2021), she increased representation at the museum through exhibitions and acquisitions that focused on women artists and artists of color. She also oversaw the renovation of Landers House, completed in 2021.

Brett Abbott started work as Executive Director & CEO in February 2022. That same year, the museum acquired Robert Duncanson, Landscape, 1870—the first work by Duncanson, a prominent African-American artist of the Hudson River School, to enter the collection.

== Collection ==
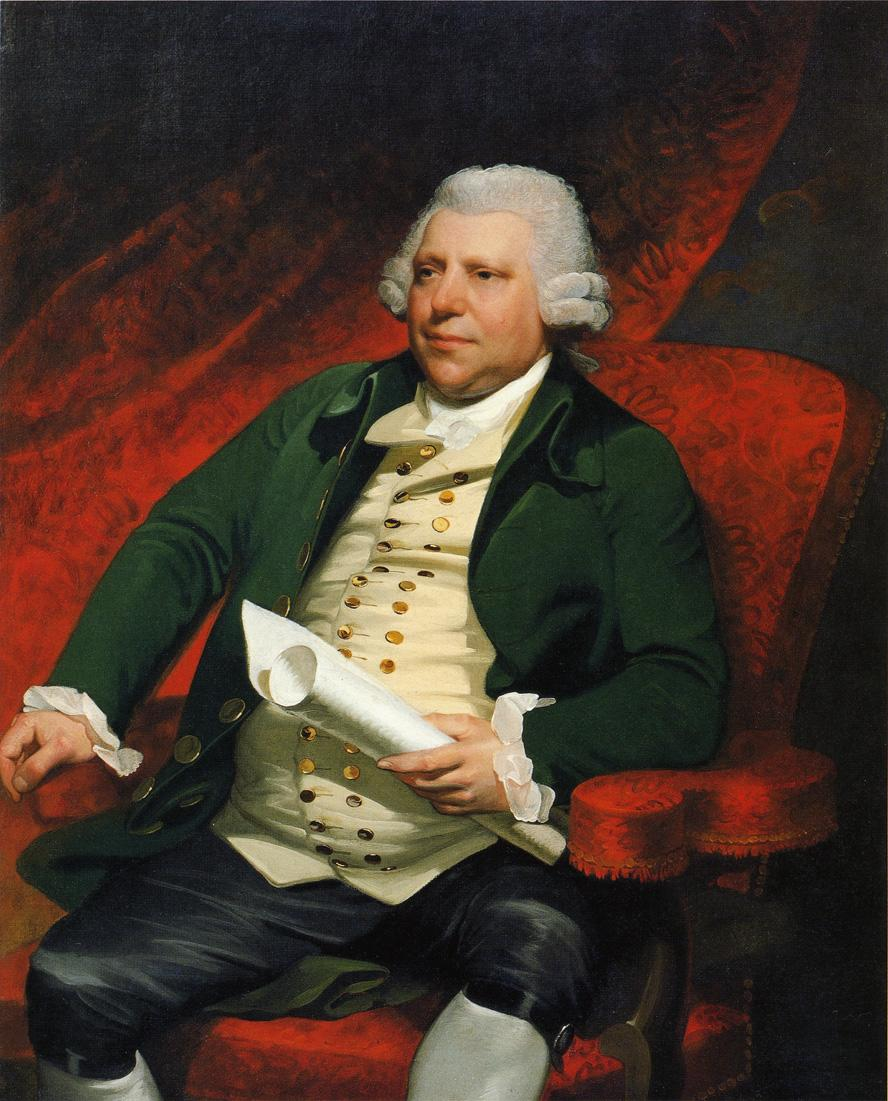
Sir Richard Arkwright, oil on canvas, Mather Brown, 1790. Collection of the New Britain Museum of American Art

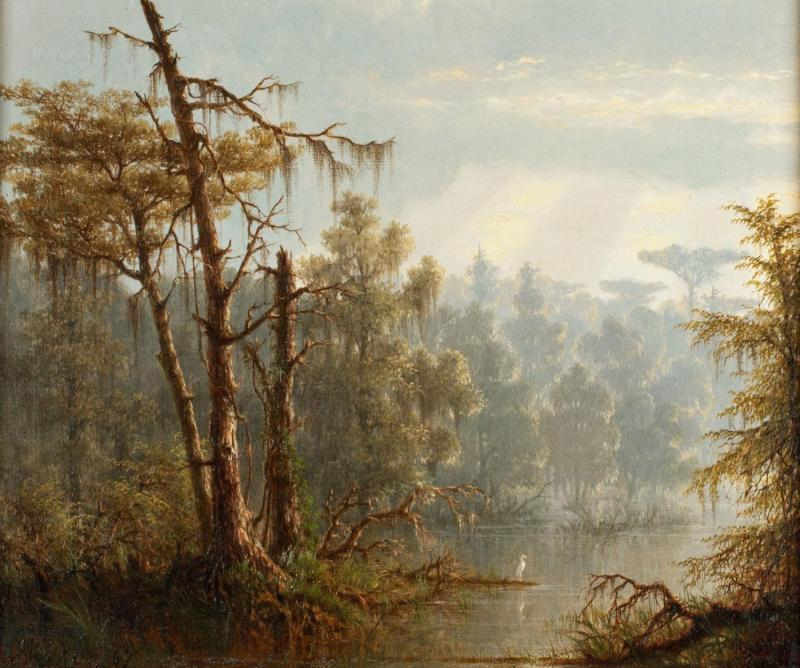
Joseph Rusling Meeker, Louisiana Bayou, 1867

The NBMAA's collection numbers about 8,274 paintings, works on paper, sculptures, and photographs, including the Sanford B.D. Low Illustration Collection, which features important works by illustrators such as Norman Rockwell, Howard Pyle, and Maxfield Parrish.

Among collection highlights are colonial and federal portraits, with examples by John Smibert, John Trumbull, John Singleton Copley, Gilbert Stuart, and the Peale family. The Hudson River School features landscapes by Thomas Cole, Asher B. Durand, Martin Johnson Heade, John Kensett, Albert Bierstadt, and Frederic Church. Still life painters range from Raphaelle Peale, Severin Roesen, William Harnett, John Peto, John Haberle, and John La Farge. American genre painting is represented by John Quidor, William Sidney Mount, and Lilly Martin Spencer. Post-Civil War examples include works by Winslow Homer, Thomas Eakins, John Singer Sargent, George de Forest Brush, and William Paxton, and 19 plasters and bronzes by Solon Borglum. American Impressionists include Mary Cassatt, Theodore Robinson, John Henry Twachtman, J. Alden Weir, Willard Metcalf, and Childe Hassam, the last represented by eleven oils. Later Impressionist paintings include those by Ernest Lawson, Frederck Frieseke, Louis Ritman, Robert Miller, and Maurice Prendergast.

Other strengths of the twentieth-century collection include: sixty works by members of the Ash Can School; significant representation by early modernists such as Alfred Maurer, Marsden Hartley, John Marin, Georgia O’Keeffe, and Max Weber; important examples by the Precisionists Charles Demuth, Charles Sheeler, Preston Dickinson, and Ralston Crawford; a broad spectrum of work by the Social Realists Ben Shahn, Romare Bearden, Jacob Lawrence, and Jack Levine; and ambitious examples of Regionalist painting by Grant Wood, John Steuart Curry, and Thomas Hart Benton, notably the latter’s celebrated five-panel mural, The Arts of Life in America (1932).

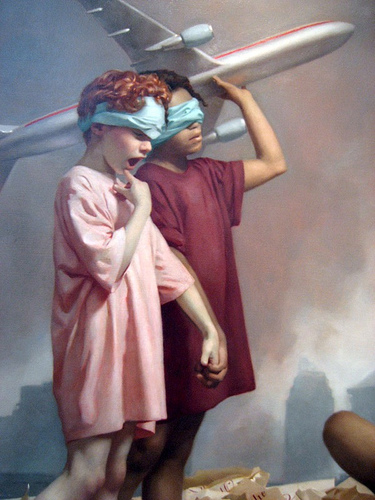
The Cycle of Terror and Tragedy (detail) by Graydon Parrish. Collection of the New Britain Museum of American Art

Works by the American Abstract Artist group (Stuart Davis, Ilya Bolotowsky, Esphyr Slobodkina, Balcomb Greene, and Milton Avery) give twentieth-century abstraction its place in the collection, as do later examples of Surrealism by artists Kay Sage and George Tooker; Abstract Expressionism (Lee Krasner, Giorgio Cavallon, Morris Graves, Robert Motherwell, Sam Francis, Cleve Gray), Pop and Op art (Andy Warhol, Larry Rivers, Robert Indiana, Tom Wesselman, Jim Dine), Conceptual (Christo, Sol LeWitt), and Photo-Realism (Robert Cottingham). Examples of twentieth-century sculpture include Harriet Frishmuth, Paul Manship, Isamu Noguchi, George Segal, and Stephen DeStaebler.

Graydon Parrish's large realist painting The Cycle of Terror and Tragedy is also part of the collection. The painting is an allegorical tribute to those lost in the terrorist attacks of September 11, 2001.
