= Alonsa Guevara =

Chilean-American painter

- Born: December 13, 1986; Rancagua, Chile
- Education: New York Academy of Art, Pontifical Catholic University of Chile
- Known for: Painting
- Website: alonsaguevara.com

Alonsa Guevara (born 1986) is a Chilean contemporary realist oil painter living and working in New York City. Her paintings are a depiction of imaginary worlds that mix fantastical and believable traits.

== Biography ==
Alonsa Guevara Aliaga was born in Rancagua, Chile and grew up for 7 years in the Ecuadorean jungle, before moving to the United States in 2011. She began making art at the age of 12. She studied at the Pontifical Catholic University of Chile and for a Masters at the New York Academy of Art, before being awarded their Fellowship in 2015. She lives in New York City, where her work has been featured by publications such as VICE, Business Insider and TimeOut.

== Style & themes ==
Guevara's early works focused on constructions of invented worlds containing characters in the form of female fashion models, represented as crumpled paper, the intricate structures of fruit, representing "desire, fecundity, and fertility", and included homages to other female artists such as Judy Chicago. Her current works juxtapose tropical fruits and mostly female nudes to represent life-cycles, the connection between humankind, nature and spiritual themes.

== Exhibitions ==
- 2018, Anna Zorina Gallery "Espíritu"
- 2018, Cheng Xi Center for Contemporary Art, Beijing, China
- 2016, Anna Zorina Gallery "Ceremonies"
- 2016, Fort Works Art "Duets"
- 2015, Mark Miller Gallery
- 2015, National Museum of Women in the Arts, Washington, DC
- 2013, Expressiones Cultural Center, New London CT "Fugitivas"

== Awards & residencies ==
- 2015 NYAA Chubb Fellowship
- Terra Foundation Residency
- Michele and Timothy Barakett Scholarship
- Elizabeth Greenshields Foundation Grant
- Ministry of Education (Chile)
