= Steven Assael =

American painter

Steven Assael (born 1957) is an American painter.

== Life ==
Born in New York, Assael attended art classes at the Museum of Modern Art at a young age, before attending the Pratt Institute in Brooklyn. He currently teaches at the School of Visual Arts in New York and at The New York Academy of Art.

Solo and group exhibitions have included the Staempfli Gallery (New York, NY), Forum Gallery (New York, NY), Fendrick Gallery (Washington DC), National Arts Club (New York, NY), Yale University (New Haven, CT), San Francisco Museum of Fine Art (San Francisco, CA), Arkansas Art Center (Little Rock, AR), Kennesaw State University (Kennesaw, GA), Stephen F Austin State College (Nacogdoches, TX), University of North Carolina (Chapel Hill, NC), Phillbrook Museum of Art (Tulsa, OK), and the National Museum in Gdansk, Poland.

In 1999 his work was exhibited in a ten-year retrospective at the Frye Art Museum in Seattle, Washington and CBS Sunday Morning ran a feature on the artist and the show.
