= New York Academy of Art =

Private art school in New York City

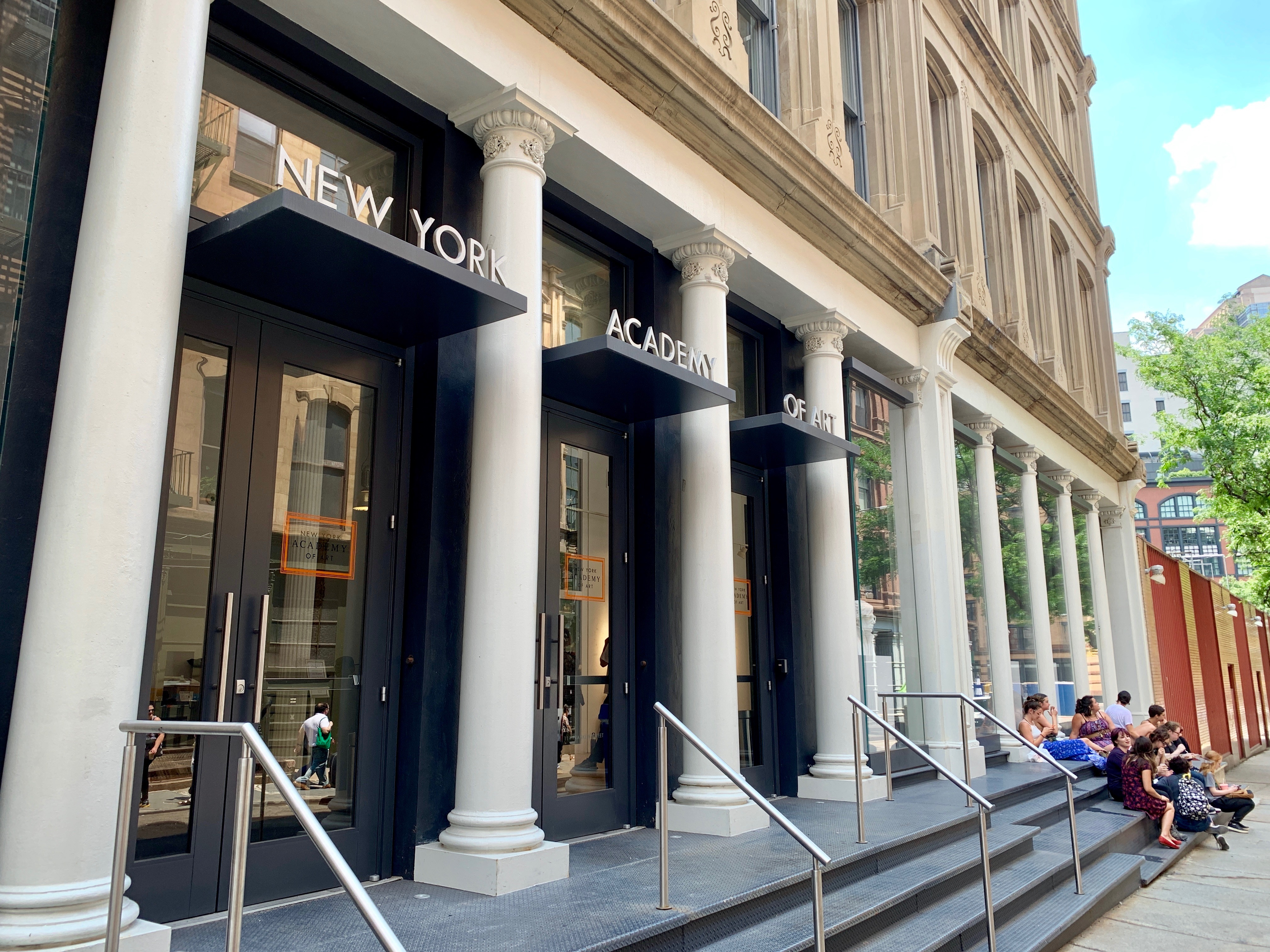
- Other name: Graduate School of Figurative Art
- Type: Private art school
- Established: 1980
- President: Paul R. Provost
- Provost: Peter Drake
- Students: 100
- Location: 111 Franklin Street, New York City; 40.7184°N 74.0060°W
- Campus: Urban
- Website: www.nyaa.edu

The New York Academy of Art is a private, graduate-only art school in the Tribeca neighborhood of New York City. The academy offers a Master of Fine Arts degree and a post-baccalaureate Certificate of Fine Art degree, with a focus on technical training and critical discourse.

The school annually hosts two public events: the TriBeCa Ball and the fund-raising auction Take Home a Nude at Sotheby’s Auction House in New York, both known to attract high-profile guests.

== History ==
=== Early years ===
In the late 1970s, a group of realist New York artists including Jack Beal, Alfred Leslie, Rafael Soyer, and Milet Andrejevic, recognized a need for arts instruction grounded in the teaching of traditional skills. The early school, then known as the New York Drawing Association, began instruction in 1980 in a rented basement space at the Middle Collegiate Church on the Lower East Side, with New York businessman and art collector Stuart Pivar providing key financial support.

According to sculptor Barney Hodes, the early school was created through a merger in 1982 of two schools started in 1979: the New Brooklyn School of Life Drawing, Painting and Sculpture (formed by Hodes and Francis Cunningham) and the New York Drawing Association (created by Stuart Pivar).

In a recently published account of early days of the school, Pivar describes his role as its primary founder, inspired by a suggestion to start such a school by his close friend Andy Warhol. Pivar assembled the early faculty and advisory committees which included Beal, Leslie, Soyer, Andrejevic, as well as Frank Mason and Nelson Shanks, and secured the lease at the Middle Collegiate Church in 1980.

Pivar disputes Hodes's account that the school was a result of a merger between the New York Drawing Association and the New Brooklyn School. Pivar acknowledges that in 1983 Hodes and Cunningham were brought in as senior faculty, and that several trustees of the New Brooklyn School were added to the academy's board, but that the union was acrimonious and that Hodes, Cunningham, and former New Brooklyn School board members Barbara Stanton and James Cox had left the school by 1985.

In 1984, the New York Academy of Art (NYAA) relocated to Lafayette Street in the East Village and expanded its administration, faculty, and curriculum, with additional support from Pivar. By 1986, the New York Times reported that the NYAA had grown to serve 40 full-time students, all on scholarship, along with 150 part-time students enrolled in fee-based night classes. The arts curricula centered on building the classical skills of realism including training in perspective drawing and working from life models to sculpt the human form.

Later accounts of the formation of the academy list pop artist Andy Warhol as one of its key founders and funders, along with Pivar. After Warhol died in 1987, he left a bequest to the academy, allowing it to purchase its Franklin Street headquarters in Tribeca. Warhol was reportedly a supporter of artists "learning all of the tools of their trade", and the Warhol Foundation had given the academy more than $1 million (as of 2004).

=== Franklin Street building ===
In 1990, the NYAA began operating out of the Franklin Street building, a five-story 42,000 square foot landmark building originally designed by Benjamin Warner in 1861. Following a 2001 fire that damaged 50 percent of the interior space, the building was renovated by TRA Studio. The same firm continued to renovate and improve the school starting in 2010 (through at least 2020) and included the restoration of the facade in collaboration with the New York City Landmarks Preservation Commission.

== Management ==
Paul R. Provost was appointed president of the New York Academy of Art in April 2025. Provost previously served as the founding chief executive officer of Art Bridges Foundation and held senior leadership roles at Christie’s, including deputy chairman. Provost holds a doctorate in art history from Princeton University.

David Kratz was appointed president of the school in 2009. Prior to his leadership appointment at NYAA, Kratz had worked in public relations for two decades before he earned a graduate degree in painting from the academy in 2008. He served as president until 2025.

The school's provost is Peter Drake, who has also served as the academic dean of students since 2010. Drake joined NYAA in 2010, after working at Parsons School of Design.

=== Disputes ===
The school is also known for several major disputes among administrators and the ouster of more than one financial controller accused of embezzling funds.

New York magazine reported that Stuart Pivar was maneuvered off the school's board in 1994 by board chairman Russell Colgate Wilkinson and board member Dennis Smith. A 1994 report by education consultant Robert Montgomery accused the school of failing to uphold the basic requirements of an educational institution. Montgomery noted that the financial and educational committees were in violation of the school's bylaws, as was Smith for serving well beyond the four-year term limit for chairman.

Pivar sued the academy for losing several of his artworks. The dispute with Pivar escalated and he sued the college in 1997 asking $50 million for "emotional and mental distress". The claims were later dismissed.

In the early 2000s, Pivar helped to expose an embezzling con-artist working within the academy.

=== Ties to Jeffrey Epstein ===
Financier Jeffrey Epstein, who was later convicted of child sex offences, was a board member from 1987 to 1994. Academy alumna Maria Farmer criticized Eileen Guggenheim for pressuring her in 1995, for the sake of the academy, to undersell her artwork to Epstein and Ghislaine Maxwell during her graduate exhibition. Several NYAA alumni traveled with Farmer to Epstein's New Mexico ranch on a trip organized by Guggenheim, who was the dean of students in 1995.

The students described the trip as awkward, and having included a bizarre, competitive dinner party, at which they were led to believe that Epstein was planning to grant one of them a major commission, which never materialized. After Farmer and her younger sister Annie were abused by Epstein and Maxwell in 1996, she reported the incident to Guggenheim, who did not take any action. In May 2020, a petition began circulating that called for Guggenheim's resignation from her position at NYAA as chair of the Board of Trustees due to her earlier involvement with Epstein in the 1990s. Former president Stuart Pivar had also been a close associate of Epstein, having written a note and poem for Epstein's birthday book in 2003.

== Public events ==
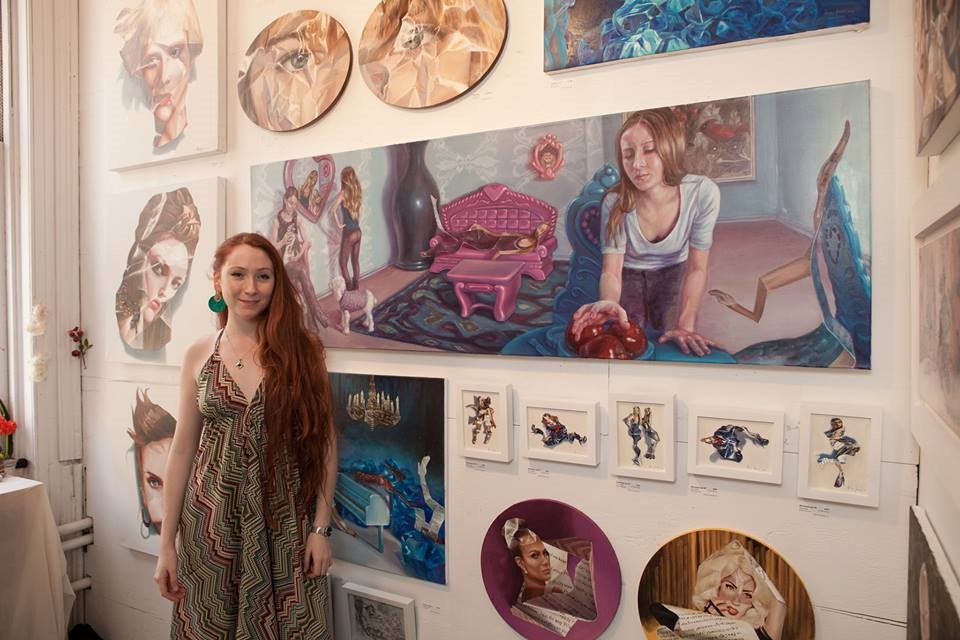
Alonsa Guevara in her studio at the Tribeca Ball, 2013

The academy hosts two major public events annually, the Tribeca Ball and the Take Home a Nude auction at Sotheby’s Auction House in New York.

The first Tribeca Ball was held in 1994. The event, held each year at the Franklin Street building, is an important fundraiser for the school and is known to attract high-profile attendees. Attendees are able to visit over 100 artists' studios and view artwork during a cocktail hour before the main event of dinner in the first floor "cast hall". In 2020, the annual Tribeca Ball, held in Spring, was moved to a virtual experience online due to the COVID-19 outbreak.

== Academics and accreditation ==
The New York Academy of Art offers a two-year Masters of Fine Arts program, with a total enrollment of approximately 100 students. The academy also offers continuing education classes and a post-baccalaureate Certificate in Fine Art.

The academy was granted an Absolute Charter on June 24, 1994, by the Board of Regents of the University of the State of New York. It is institutionally accredited by the Board of Regents and the Commissioner of Education acting under their standing as a nationally recognized accrediting agency.

In 2013, the academy was accredited by the National Association of Schools of Art and Design (NASAD). The school was accredited by the Middle States Commission on Higher Education (MSCHE) in 2016.

== Facilities ==
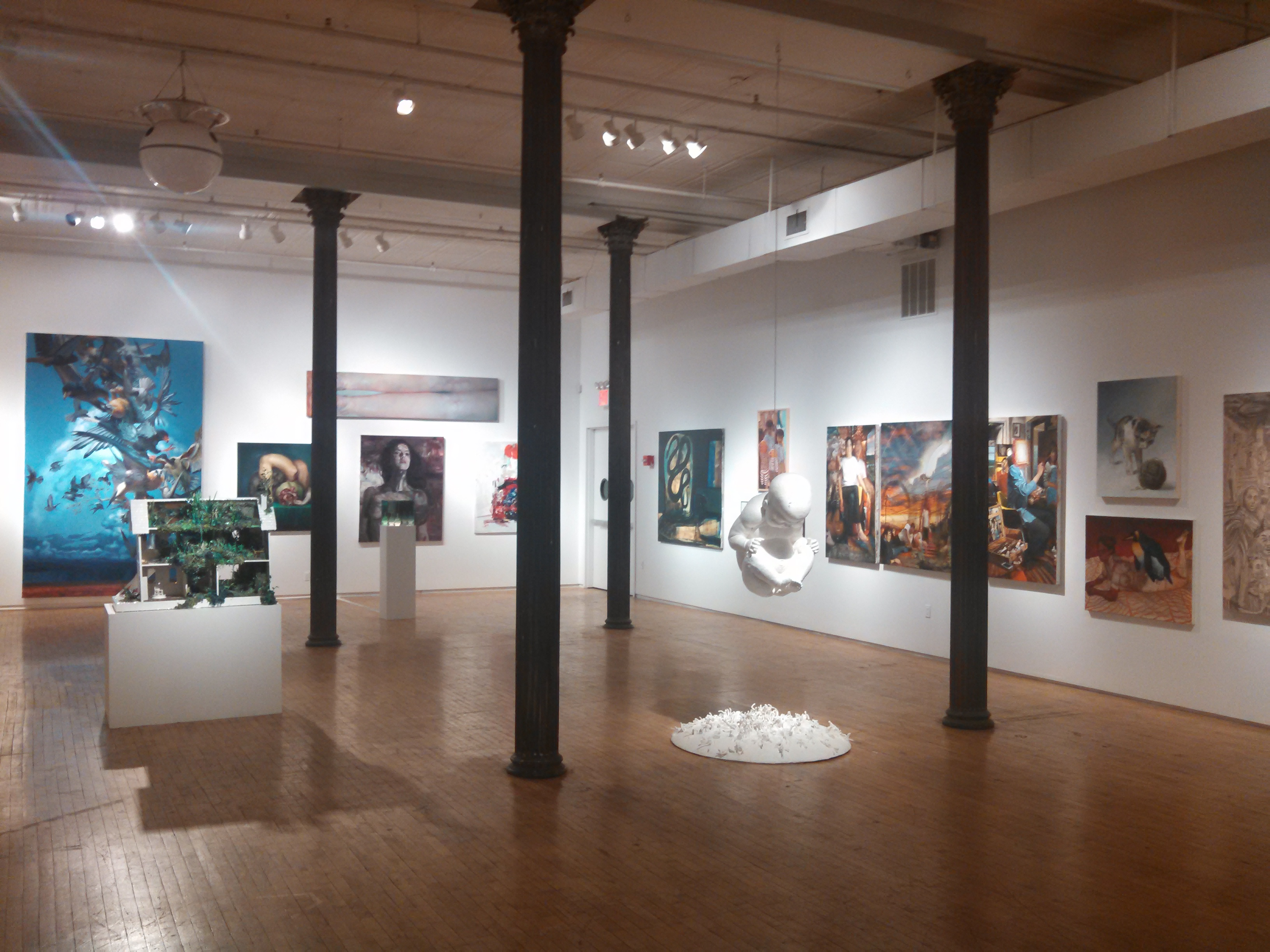
New York Academy of Art, Tribeca Gallery in 2014

In total, the academy houses eight MFA classrooms, multiple exhibition spaces, approximately 100 studio spaces, a library and archives, three student lounges, a woodshop, a kiln, sculpture floor, and printmaking facilities.

== Notable alumni ==
- Princess Alexandra of Greece (MFA 2018)
- Ali Banisadr (MFA 2007)
- Dina Brodsky (MFA 2006)
- Aleah Chapin (MFA 2012, Fellow 2013)
- Sean Delonas (MFA 1992)
- Stephanie Deshpande (MFA 1999)
- Maria Farmer (MFA 1995)
- Sabin Howard (MFA 1995)
- Dony MacManus (MFA 2001)
- Joseph Menna (MFA 1994)
- Alyssa Monks (MFA 2001)
- Graydon Parrish
- Richard T. Scott (MFA 2007)
- Levan Songulashvili (MFA 2017)
- Patricia Watwood

== See also ==
- Education in New York City
- List of art schools
